= List of dams and reservoirs in Pakistan =

Location of major dams in Pakistan

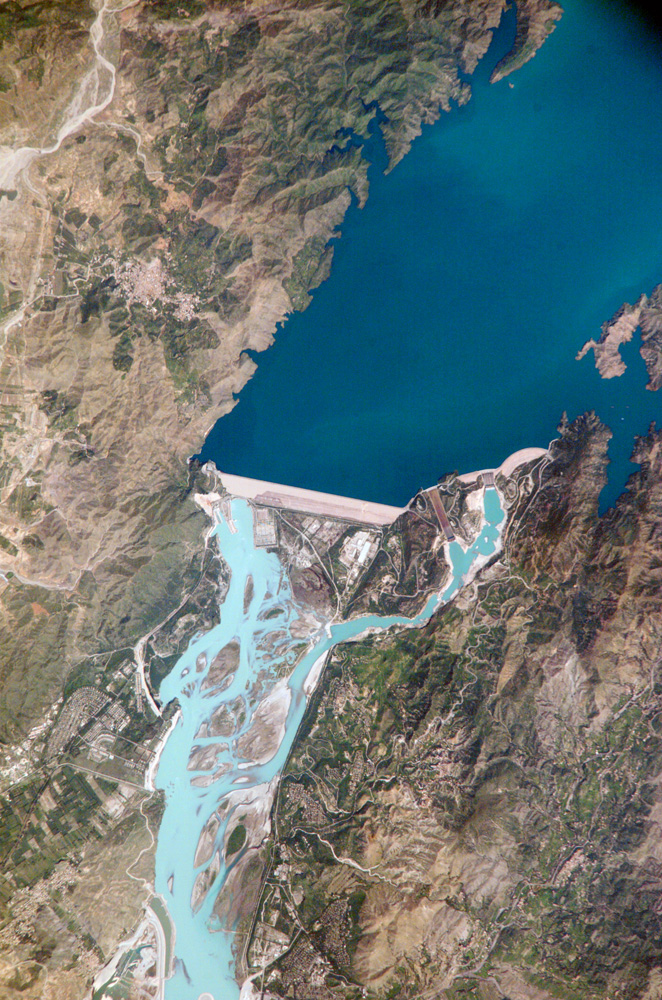
Tarbela Dam, KPK

Rawal Dam, Islamabad

This page shows the province-wise list of dams and reservoirs in Pakistan.

As of 2026, there are total 1,016 dams in Pakistan; details of which are as under:

- Balochistan 744 (most of which are small check dams for increasing ground water level)
- Punjab 36 (including 13 small dams)
- Khyber Pakhtunkhwa 62
- Sindh 160
- Islamabad 4
- Under management of Federal Government:
  - Khyber Pakhtunkhwa 5
  - Gilgit-Baltistan 2

Meanwhile, a further 249 dams are under construction:

- Balochistan 189,
- KPK 23
- Sindh 37

Pakistan stands 12th in number of dams on global level falling below Brazil and above Mexico. According to the International Commission on Large Dams, 73 dams and reservoirs in Pakistan are over 15 m (49 ft) in height. Tarbela Dam in Pakistan's Khyber Pakhtunkhwa is the largest earth-filled dam in the world, and is the second largest by the structural volume. Mirani Dam is the largest dam in the world in terms of volume for flood protection with a floodstock of 588,690 cubic hectometers, while Sabakzai Dam is the 7th largest with a floodstock of 23,638 cubic hectometers. On 21 January 2021, the government of Balochistan announced that it will build 16 new small dams in the Balochistan province. Similarly, the Government of Punjab announced 13 new small dam projects along the Sulaiman Mountains.

== Large dams ==
According to the International Commission on Large Dams (ICOLD), dams with height above the foundation greater than 15 metres (49 ft) are known as large dams. The complete list of large dams in Pakistan is provided below.

Bold: major dams, height > 100 metres (330 ft)
NA: data unavailable

== Azad Jammu and Kashmir (Pakistan administered Kashmir) ==
River	Dam/Reservoir	Location	Type	Height	Length	Storage capacity m³ (acre-ft)	Reservoir area km² (sq mi)	Year of completion	Purpose
Jhelum River	Mangla Dam	Mirpur District	Embankment dam	147 m (482 ft)	138 metres (453 ft)	9,115,417,200 m^{3} (7,389,989 acre⋅ft)	250 km^{2} (97 sq mi)	1967	Irrigation, Hydroelectric & Water supply
Neelum River	Neelum–Jhelum	Muzaffarabad District	Gravity dam	60 m (197 ft)	47 metres (154 ft)	8,000,000 m^{3} (6,486 acre⋅ft)	N/A	2018	Hydroelectric & Water supply
Poonch River	Gulpur	Kotli District	Gravity dam	35 m (115 ft)	238 metres (781 ft)	21,893,000 m^{3} (17,749 acre⋅ft)	9,390 km^{2} (3,625 sq mi)	2020	Hydroelectric & Water supply

== Balochistan ==
As per sources of Provincial Irrigation Department, there are 744 dams in Balochistan including small, medium and large dams with total capacity of 1.68 M.Aft of water storage. However, 189 further small and medium dams with total capacity of 0.9 M.Aft is under construction as of March 2026. Further 20 dams with 0.85 M.Aft is under feasibility process.

Name	Location/ nearest city	Impounds	Height	Storage capacity	Year of completion	Coordinates
Hanna Lake	Quetta		15 metres (49 ft)	1330 Acre feet	1894	30°15′N 67°06′E
Spinkarez Dam	Quetta	Nar River and Murdar River	29 metres (95 ft)	6,800,000 m^{3} (5,513 acre⋅ft)	1945	30.2217, 67.1413
Walitangi Dam	Quetta		24 metres (79 ft)	510,000 m^{3} (413 acre⋅ft)	1961	30.2627, 67.2437
Akra Kaur Dam	Gwadar	Akra Kaur River	21 metres (69 ft)	21,000,000 m^{3} (17,025 acre⋅ft)	1995	25.3584, 62.2795
Hub Dam	Lasbela	Hub River	48 metres (157 ft)	1,057,000,000 m^{3} (856,924 acre⋅ft)	1979	25°15′21″N 67°6′51″E
Hingol Dam	Lasbela		32 metres (105 ft)	2.10 M acre feet		25.3870, 62.8577
Choutair Dam	Ziarat	Ghata Tiza Stream				30.4912, 67.5863
Mirani Dam	Makran	Dasht River	39 metres (128 ft)	373,000,000 m^{3} (302,396 acre⋅ft)	2006	25°56′28″N 62°41′36″E
Neelag Dasht Dam	District Kech	Dasht River			2019	25.7962, 62.8003
Sabakzai Dam	Zhob	Zhob River	34.75 metres (114.0 ft)	32,700 acre⋅ft (40,334,856 m^{3})	2007	30°56′51″N 69°21′23″E
Shadi Kaur Dam	Pasni		25 metres (82 ft)	37,000 acre⋅ft (45,638,828 m^{3})		25.5362, 63.4159
Akra Kaur Dam	Gwadar		32 metres (105 ft)	5270 acre feet		25°21′29″N 62°16′44″E
Hingol Dam	Lasbela		32 metres (105 ft)	2.10 M acre feet		25.3870, 62.8577
Bellar Dam	Gwadar			9500 acre feet		25.5438, 62.6685
Dosi Kaur Dam	Pasni, Gwadar			16000 acre feet		25.4275, 63.5085
Basol Dam	Ormara	Basol River	32 metres (105 ft)	37500 acre feet	2025	25.5859, 64.3548

=== Small Dams/ Action Delay Dams ===
Name	Location/ nearest city	Storage capacity	Year of completion	Coordinates
Jhalwani Dam	Dera Bugti	430 AF		29.4937, 69.4926
Kunal Dam	Dera Bugti	1240 AF		29.4727, 69.4700
Dokurm Dam	Turbat	1240 AF	2003	25.9666, 63.0923
Gameshi Dam	Khuzdar	1977 AF		
Soro Dam	Zehri, Khuzdar	886 AF		
Dastak Dam	Zehri, Khuzdar	1625 AF		
Teigh Dam	Khuzdar	230 AF		
PMDC Dam	Quetta	300 AF		30.1928, 67.0718
Sra ghurghai Dam	Quetta	102 AF		30.2903, 67.0571
Tangi Barakwal Dam	Zhob	6800 AF		
Arek Dam	Zhob	3500 AF		
Haftain Dam	Kharan	2717 AF		
Variagi Dam	Loralai			
Pathankot Dam	Loralai			
Sothgan Dam	Kharan	500 AF		
Pathnak Dam	Gawash, Kharan	4890 AF		
Regora Dam	Sanjavi	500 AF		
Sassi Pannu Dam	Hub	2246 AF		
Kinniri Dam	Hub	1240 AF		
Shenzani Dam	Pasni, Gwadar	2600 AF		
Khedarzai Dam	Loralai	1625 AF		30.3323, 68.6625
Wach Wani Dam	Ziarat	750 AF		
Sorap Dam	Turbat			25.9668, 62.9842
Sotkal Dam	Pasni Rd, Turbat	280AF		
Rodhan Dam	Kallag Meri, Turbat	2552 AF		
Garukki Dam	Turbat	2445 AF		
Peachi Dam	Ziarat	337 AF		
Toiwar Batozai Dam	Killa Saifullah	98000 AF		
Pogolok Dam	Sari kahan, Turbat	337 AF		
Katki Khisar Dam	Kalat			
Amach Dam	Mastung	1,675,000 m^{3} (1,358 acre⋅ft)		29.7794, 66.8951
Sawar Dam	Gwadar	45000 AF		
Sur Kaur Dam	Gwadar	1264 AF		
Band Khushdil Khan	Pishin	10400 AF		30.6666, 67.0629
Gazoo Dam	District Kohlu			
Kadani Dam	Qilla Abdullah			
Jhandra Dam	Lasbela			
Malgagai Dam	Killa Saifullah			
Makhal Dam	Qilla Abdullah			
Bostan Dam	Pishin			
Arambi Dam	Qilla Abdullah			
Dinnar Dam	Qilla Abdullah	2999 AF		
Makola Dam	Gwadar			
Uthandaro Dam	Lasbela			
Jintari Dam	District Kech	3500 AF		

=== Under Consideration/ TBD ===
Name	Location/ nearest city	Impounds	Year of Completion	Height	Storage capacity	Coordinates
Mangi Dam	Ziarat					30.3569, 67.4961
Naulong Dam	Jhal Magsi	Mula River	56.7 metres (186 ft)			28.4546, 67.3378
Sri Toi Dam	Zhob		38 metres (125 ft)		26117 Acre Feet	31°35′56″N 69°16′08″E
Khisar Dam	Nushki	Kaisar Rud				29.5822, 66.0462

== Gilgit-Baltistan ==
Name	Location/ nearest city	Impounds	Height	Storage capacity	Year of completion	Electrical capacity
**Katzarah Dam**	Skardu	Shyok, Shigar, and Indus		35,000,000 acre feet	TBD	1500 MW
Satpara Dam	Skardu	Satpara	39 metres (128 ft)	93,310 acre feet	2013	17 MW
Bunji Dam	Bunji	Indus	190 metres (620 ft)	1900 m^{3}/s	TBD	7100 MW

== Islamabad Capital Territory ==
Name	Location/ nearest city	Impounds	Height	Storage capacity	Year of completion
Angoori Dam	Islamabad Capital Territory	Korang River		2,550,000 m^{3} (2,067 acre⋅ft)	
Rawal Dam	Islamabad Capital Territory	Korang River	40.7 m (133.5 ft)	58,600,000 m^{3} (47,508 acre⋅ft)	1962
Simly Dam	Islamabad Capital Territory	Soan River	89.7 m	35,463,000 m^{3} (28,750 acre⋅ft)	1983
Sandaymar Dam	Islamabad Capital Territory	Sandaymar River	14.6 m (47.9 ft)	802,995 m^{3} (651 acre⋅ft)	1990

== Khyber Pakhtunkhwa ==
Name	Location/ nearest city	Impounds	Height	Storage capacity	Year of completion
Dandy Dam	Miranshah		25 m (82 ft)	5,945,000 m^{3} (4,820 acre⋅ft)	2011
Dargai Pal Dam	Wana		30 m (98 ft)	5,896,000 m^{3} (4,780 acre⋅ft)	2008
Allai Khwar	Battagram	Allai Khwar River	51 metres (167 ft)		2012
Jalozai Barani Dam	Nowshehra Pabbi	N/A	74 metres (243 ft)	1,277 m^{3} (1 acre⋅ft)	2015
Auxiliary Kandar Dam	Kohat	Dargai Algad River	23 metres (75 ft)		2004
Aza Khel Dam	Peshawar	N/A	23 metres (75 ft)		2004
Baran Dam	Bannu	Kurram River and Baran Stream	39 metres (128 ft)	100,001.621 acre⋅ft (123,350,183 m^{3})	1962
Chaatri Dam	Haripur	Nain Sukh River	26 metres (85 ft)		1971
Chanda Fateh Khan Dam	Kohat	N/A	25 metres (82 ft)		2004
Changhoz Dam	Karak	Changhoz River	43 metres (141 ft)		2007
Darwazai Dam	Kohat	Sodal Algada River	15 metres (49 ft)		1976
Gandially Dam	Kohat	Taru Algada River	22 metres (72 ft)		2002
Gomal Zam Dam	Wana		133 m (436 ft)	1,140,000 acre⋅ft (1.406169295×10^{9} m^{3})	2012
Kahal Dam	Hazara	Kahal River	22 metres (72 ft)		1971
Kandar Dam	Kohat	Dargai Algada River	27 metres (89 ft)		1970
Khal Dam	Haripur	Khal Kass River	23 metres (75 ft)		1972
Khan Khwar	Besham, Shangla	Khan Khwar River	46 metres (151 ft)		2012
Khanpur Dam	Haripur	Haro River	51 metres (167 ft)		1983
Mang Dam	Haripur	Haro River	16 metres (52 ft)		1970
Naryab Dam	Hangu	Naryab River	32 metres (105 ft)		2006
Warsak Dam	Peshawar	Kabul River	67 metres (220 ft)	76,492,000 m^{3} (62,013 acre⋅ft)	1960
Zaibi Dam	Karak	Zaibi Algad River	25 metres (82 ft)		1997
Tanda Dam	Kohat	Kohat River	35 metres (115 ft)		1967
Tarbela (Auxiliary-1 Dam)	Ghazi	Indus River	105 metres (344 ft)		1974
Tarbela (Auxiliary-2 Dam)	Ghazi	Indus River	67 metres (220 ft)		1974
**Tarbela Dam**	Haripur	Indus River	143.26 metres (470.0 ft)	13,690,000,000 m^{3} (11,098,664 acre⋅ft)	1974
Sarki Lawaghar Dam	Karak	Tem River	40 metres (130 ft)		2006
Duber Khwar	Pattan, Kohistan	Khan Khwar River	97.57 metres (320.1 ft)		2013

== Punjab ==
Name	Location/ nearest city	Impounds	Height	Storage capacity	Year of completion
Chahan Dam	Rawalpindi, Punjab	Sill Kus River	46.634 metres (153.00 ft)	47,425,395 m^{3} (38,448 acre⋅ft)	2018
Dungi Dam	Rawalpindi, Punjab		21.64 metres (71.0 ft)	2,170,611.5 m^{3} (1,760 acre⋅ft)	1971
Jamal Dam	Rawalpindi, Punjab		18.28 metres (60.0 ft)	26.518 m^{3} (0 acre⋅ft)	2005
Jawa Dam	Dhalla, Rawalpindi District	Jawa River	25 metres (82 ft)	1,938,000 m^{3} (1,571 acre⋅ft)	1994
Philna Dam	Philna, Rawalpindi District		22.55 metres (74.0 ft)	4,809,877.8 m^{3} (3,899 acre⋅ft)	2008
Khasala Dam	Rawalpindi, Punjab		18.28 metres (60.0 ft)	2,978,424.3 m^{3} (2,415 acre⋅ft)	2023
Mahuta Chak Beli Dam	Chak Beli Khan, Rawalpindi, Punjab		18.28 metres (60.0 ft)	2,978,424.3 m^{3} (2,415 acre⋅ft)	1985
Misriot Dam	Rawalpindi, Punjab		14.02 metres (46.0 ft)	690,649 m^{3} (560 acre⋅ft)	1963
Nirali Dam	Rawalpindi, Punjab		20.879 cubic metres (737.3 cu ft)	841,111.96 m^{3} (682 acre⋅ft)	1970
Ugahan Dam	Rawalpindi, Punjab		25.908 cubic metres (914.9 cu ft)	9,989,746.1 m^{3} (8,099 acre⋅ft)	2008
Ghazi Barotha Dam	Attock, Punjab	Indus River		22,500,000 m^{3} (18,241 acre⋅ft)	2003
Haji Shah Dam	Attock, Punjab	Sil river	22 metres (72 ft)	1,800,000 m^{3} (1,459 acre⋅ft)	2013-14
Jabbi Dam	Attock, Punjab		10.765 metres (35.32 ft)	3,395,290.4 m^{3} (2,753 acre⋅ft)	1991
Kanjoor Dam	Attock, Punjab		18.669 metres (61.25 ft)	3,496,411.1 m^{3} (2,835 acre⋅ft)	1975
Mirwal Dam	Attock, Punjab		24.079 metres (79.00 ft)	4,643,382 m^{3} (3,764 acre⋅ft)	1990
Shahpur Dam	Attock, Punjab		25.908 metres (85.00 ft)	17,660,885 m^{3} (14,318 acre⋅ft)	1986
Shakardara Dam	Attock, Punjab		35.052 metres (115.00 ft)	7,003,922 m^{3} (5,678 acre⋅ft)	1994
Spiala Dam	Attock, Punjab		11.454 metres (37.58 ft)	722,714.97 m^{3} (586 acre⋅ft)	1964
Ratti Kassi Dam	Attock, Punjab		14.31 metres (46.9 ft)	2,404,938.9 m^{3} (1,950 acre⋅ft)	1970
Channi Bor Dam	Attock, Punjab		19.507 metres (64.00 ft)	2,414,805.3 m^{3} (1,958 acre⋅ft)	1979
Qibla Bandi Dam	Attock, Punjab		21.336 metres (70.00 ft)	2,244,609.6 m^{3} (1,820 acre⋅ft)	1971
Thatti Syedan Dam	Attock, Punjab		13 metres (43 ft)	739,981.2 m^{3} (600 acre⋅ft)	2005
Sawal Dam	Attock, Punjab		28.956 metres (95.00 ft)	2,959,924.8 m^{3} (2,400 acre⋅ft)	2005

== Sindh ==
Name	Location/ nearest city	Impounds	Height	Storage capacity	Year of completion
Darawat Dam	Jamshoro District	Nari Baran River	43 metres (141 ft)	150,000,000 m^{3} (121,607 acre⋅ft)	2014
Chotiari Dam	Sanghar District	Nara Canal (Indus River)	26.3 metres (86 ft)	750,000 m^{3} (608 acre⋅ft)	2002
Nai Gaj Dam	Dadu District	Nai Gaj river	59.1 metres (194 ft)	30,000,000 m^{3} (24,321 acre⋅ft)	2025

== Small dams ==
There are estimates Pakistan needs to build minimum 750 small dams to meet water requirements for its growing local and regional population.

=== Punjab ===
- Basal Dam

Basal Dam is located about 16 km from Mithyal Chowk of Rawalpindi Kohat road in Attock, Punjab. Basal Dam was completed in 2009.

==== Chakwal District ====
There are 13 small dams in Chakwal district having storage capacity of 26,411 in acres feet irrigating 11,089 acres of area.

- Khokher Zer Dam
- Surlah Dam
- Dhok Talian Dam
- Kot Raja Dam
- Dhoke Qutab Din Dam
- Nikka Dam
- Walana Dam
- Khai Gurabh Dam
- Pira Fatehal Dam
- Bhagtal Dam
- Dhurnal Dam
- Mial Dam
- Kanwal Dam
- Dhrabi Dam
- Khai Dam
- Chowkhandi Dam
- Minwal Dam
- Ratta Sharif Dam
- Thoa Mahrum Khan Dam

==== Jhelum District ====
- Tain Pura Dam
- Jammergal Dam
- Garat Dam
- Salial Dam
- Domeli Dam
- Shah Habib Dam
- Gurha Utam Singh Dam
- Fatehpur Dam
- Lehri Dam
- Dungi Dam
- Nirali Dam
- Phalina Dam
- Pandori Dam

==== Rawalpindi ====
- Jawa Dam
- Misriot Dam

== Proposed and under construction ==
=== Balochistan ===
- Garuk Dam – proposed dam located on Garuk River, 47 km south east of Kharan District, Balochistan. The earth core rock-filled dam will have a height of 184 feet and a reservoir capacity of 50,695 acre feet. The reservoir when completed will irrigate a command area of 12,500 acres and will have hydro-power capacity of 300 KW.
- Pelar Dam – proposed dam located across Nai River in Awaran District, Balochistan. The concrete gravity dam will be 60 feet high and will have a gross storage capacity of 99,175 acre feet. It will irrigate a command area of 25,650 acres. Installed capacity of the power station will be 300 KW. Due to financial constraints, funding for the project was stopped in 2011.
- Winder Dam – proposed dam on Winder River, Balochistan about 25km from Windar, Hub District. The earth core rockfill dam will be 102 feet high with a gross storage capacity of 36,484 acre-feet and a command area of 10,000 acres. It will have a hydro-power generation capacity of 300 KW.
- Naulong Dam – is an embankment dam currently under construction on the Mula River, about 30 km from Gandawah City in Jhal Magsi district of Balochistan, Pakistan. The zoned earth-filled dam is 186 feet high with a gross storage of 0.242 MAF and a command area of 47,000 acres. It has a hydro power capacity of 4.4 MW.
- Khisar Dam – Kalat
- Hingol Dam – proposed
- Sukleji Dam – proposed
- Badin Zai Dam – proposed
- Siri Toi Dam, Zhob– under construction
- Peechi Dam – Ziarat
- Pathan Kot Dam – Loralai
- Bellar Dam –Gwadar
- Shadi Kaur Dam – Pasni
- Sawar Dam – Gwadar
- Sur Kaur Dam – Gwadar
- Surap Dam – Turbat
- Khisar Dam – under construction

=== Islamabad ===
- Chirah Dam – proposed
- Chiniot Dam (Islamabad) – proposed
- Dotara Dam – proposed
- Shahdara Dam – proposed

=== Gilgit Baltistan ===
- Diamer-Bhasha Dam – under construction
- Bunji Dam – proposed
- Katzarah Dam – proposed
- Shyok Dam – proposed

=== Azad Kashmir ===
- Dudhnial Dam – proposed

=== Khyber Pakhtunkhwa ===
- Kurram Tangi Dam – under construction
- Dasu Dam – under construction
- Dotara Dam – proposed
- Bara Dam – proposed
- Mohmand Dam – under construction
- Kalam Dam – under construction in Kalam Valley
- Othla Dam – under construction
- Jabba Dam – located in Jamrud Tehsil of Khyber District
- Jalozai Dam – located in Pabbi Tehsil of Khyber District
- Tank Zam Dam – proposed
- Daraban Zam Dam – proposed

=== Punjab ===
- Akhori Dam – Attock, Punjab – proposed
- Dadhocha Dam – under construction
- Mahuta Chak Beli Dam – under construction
- Kalabagh Dam – proposed
- Papin Dam – proposed
- Chiniot Dam – proposed
- Murunj Dam – proposed
- Soan Dam – proposed
- Sora Dam – proposed
- Rohtas Dam – proposed

=== Sindh ===
- Nai Gaj Dam – under construction

== See also ==
- Gabar dams
- List of barrages and headworks in Pakistan
- Hydropower Projects in Pakistan
- List of hydroelectric power stations in Pakistan
- List of lakes in Pakistan
- Deserts of Pakistan
- Provinces of Pakistan
- Business ideas in Pakistan
