= List of hydroelectric power stations in Pakistan =

This is a list of hydroelectric power stations in Pakistan as of 2024.

== In service ==
S/N	Station	Location	Type of power station	Capacity (MW)	In-service year
1	Renala	Renala, Punjab	Run of canal	1	1925
2	Malakand / Jabban	Malakand, KPK	Run of river	22	1935
3	Rasul	Mandi Bahauddin, Punjab	Run of canal	22	1952
4	Dargai	Malakand, KPK	Run of canal	20	1952
5	Kurram Garhi	Kurram Garhi, KPK	Run of canal	4	1958
6	Chichonki Malian	Sheikhupura, Punjab	Run of canal	13	1959
7	Warsak	Peshawar, KPK	Run of river	243	1960
8	Shadiwal	Shadiwal, Gujrat, Punjab	Run of canal	14	1961
9	Nandipur	Gujranwala, Punjab	Run of canal	14	1963
10	Mangla	Mirpur, Azad Kashmir	Reservoir	1,000	1967
11	Chitral	Chitral, KPK	Run of canal	1	1975
12	Tarbela	Tarbela, KPK	Reservoir	4,888	1977
13	Chashma	Chashma, Punjab	Run of river	184	2000
14	Jagran	Neelum, Azad Kashmir	Hydro	30	2000
15	Ghazi-Barotha	Attock, Punjab	Run of river	1,450	2003
16	Malakand-III	Malakand, KPK	Run of river/canal	84	2008
17	Khan Khwar	Shangla, KPK	Reservoir	72	2010
18	Pehur	Swabi, KPK	Canal fall/run of river	18	2010
19	Satpara Dam	Skardu, Gilgit Baltistan	Reservoir	17	2011
20	Jinnah	Jinnah Barrage, Punjab	Run of river	96	2012
21	Garam Chashma	Chitral, KPK	Hydro	1	2012
22	Allai Khwar	Mansehra, KPK	Reservoir	121	2013
23	Gomal Zam	South Waziristan	Reservoir	17	2013
24	New Bong Escape (Laraib Energy)	Mirpur, Azad Kashmir	Hydro	84	2013
25	Duber Khwar	Kohistan, KPK	Reservoir	130	2014
26	Patrind Hydro	Muzaffarabad, Azad Kashmir	Run of river	147	2017
27	Golen Gol	Chitral, KPK	Run of river	108	2018
28	Neelum–Jhelum	Muzaffarabad, Azad Kashmir	Run of river	969	2018
29	Marala Hydro (PPDCL)	Sialkot, Punjab	Canal fall/run of river	8	2018
30	Gulpur Hydropower Plant, Barali	Kotli, Azad Kashmir	Run of river	100	2020
31	Daral Khwar	Swat District, KPK	Run of river	37	2021
32	Ranolia	Kohistan, KPK	High head	17	2021
33	Karot	Azad Kashmir / Punjab	Run of river	720	2022
34	Suki Kinari	Mansehra District, KPK	Run of river	884	2024
	Total in-service generation			11,536	

== Under construction ==
Station	Community	Location	Capacity (MW)	Status
Nai Gaj Dam	Dadu, Sindh		4.2	Under construction. To be operational by Oct 2024.
Mohmand Dam	Mohmand Agency, KPK	34°21′11″N 71°31′58″E	800	Under construction. To be operational by Dec 2025.
Dasu Dam	Dasu, KPK		4,320	Under construction. Stage-I: 2,160 MW to be operational by July 2027.
Balakot Hydropower Project	Mansehra, KPK	Kunhar River	300	Under construction. To be operational by 2028.
Keyal Khwar Hydropower Project	Kohistan, KPK	Keyal Khwar River	128	Under construction. To be operational by 2026.
Tarbela Dam Extension-V	Tarbela, KPK	34°05′23″N 72°41′54″E	1,530	Under construction. To be operational by 2025.
Diamer-Bhasha Dam	Chilas, Gilgit-Baltistan		4,500	Under construction. To be operational by Jun 2029.
Kurram Tangi Dam	North Waziristan, Khyber Pakhtunkhwa		83.4	Under construction. To be operational by Jun 2026.
Total under-construction generation			11,665+	

=== Proposed ===
Station	Community	Location	Capacity (MW)	Status
Azad Pattan Hydropower Project	Sudhanoti, Azad Kashmir		700	Under construction. To be operational by 2025.
Athmuqam Dam	Athmuqam, Azad Kashmir		350	Ready to be constructed. Korea Hydro & Nuclear Power Corporation won the contract for construction.
Toren More Project	KPK		35	Ready to be constructed. Sinohydro Corporation China and Sichuan Energy Industry Investment Group Co. Ltd. China won the contract for construction.
Turtonus-Uzghor Dam	Chitral, KPK		58	Ready to be constructed. Sinohydro Corp Ltd and Sachal Engineering Works Private Ltd won the contract for construction.
Lower Spat Gah hydropower project	Kohistan, KPK		496	Ready to be constructed.
Arkari Gol Hydropower Project	Chitral, KPK		99	Ready to be constructed.
Taunsa Barrage Hydropower Plant	Muzaffargarh, Punjab		120	Ready to be constructed.
Kohala Hydropower Project	Muzaffarabad, Azad Kashmir		1124	
Shingo Kas Hydropower Project	Dir, KPK		102	
Chiniot Dam	Chiniot, Punjab		80	Proposed
Atttabad lake Project	Aliabad, Gilgit Baltistan		54	Proposed
Tangir Hydropower Project	Chilas, Gilgit-Baltistan		21	Under construction. To be operational by 2028
Chianwali Hydropower Project	Gujranwala, Punjab		5.38	Ready to be constructed.
Deg Outfall Hydropower Project	Gujranwala, Punjab		4.04	Ready to be constructed.
Okara Hydropower Project	Gujranwala, Punjab		4.16	Ready to be constructed.
Chashma Hydel Power Project	Mianwali, Punjab		5.0	Ready to be constructed.
Mahl Hydropower Project	Azad Kashmir	34°55′N 73°34′E	590	Ready to be constructed. China Three Gorges Corporation won the contract for construction.
Soan Dam	Pothohar Plateau, Punjab		5,240	Proposed.
Shevik	Gilgit-Baltistan, Pakistan		4,600	Planned.
Nekherdim-Paur Dam	Chitral, KPK		80	Ready to be constructed. CTG won the contract for construction.
Chakothi-Hattian Hydropower Project	Muzaffarabad, Azad Kashmir		500	Ready to be constructed. Chinese firm won the contract for construction.
Hanzel Hydropower Project	Hanzel, Gilgit		20	Ready to be constructed. Cost estimate $63 million.
Kalam Asrit	Kalam, KPK		197	Ready to be constructed. KPK government signed MOU with Korea’s state-owned M/S Korea South East Power Company. Cost estimate $500 million.
Ghowari Hydropower Project	Gilgit-Baltistan		30	Ready to be constructed. Cost estimate $80 million.
Bara Dam	Tirah, Khyber Agency		5.8	Ready to be constructed.
Bunji Hydropower Project	Astore District, Gilgit-Baltistan	35°39′N 74°36′E	7,100	Ready to be constructed. MOU signed with China’s National Energy Administration. Cost estimate $6.8 billion.
Kalabagh Dam	Mianwali District, Punjab		3600	Proposed.
Patan hydropower Project	Patan Village, Indus River		2,400	Ready to be constructed. MOU signed with China’s National Energy Administration. Cost estimate $6 billion.
Harpo Hydropower Project	Skardu, Gilgit-Baltistan		34.5	Ready to be constructed.
Thakot Hydropower Project	Battagram District, KPK	34°45′N 72°55′E	4,000	Feasibility studies to be completed by Dec 2017. MOU signed with China’s National Energy Administration Cost estimate $6 billion.
Phandar Hydropower Project	Gupis-Yasin District, Gilgit-Baltistan		81	Detailed engineering design or tender of documents under process. Cost estimate $128 million .
Basho Hydropower Station	Skardu, GB, Indus River		28	Detailed engineering design or tender of documents under process. Cost estimate $40 million.
Tank Zam Dam	Hinis Tangi, KPK, Tank Zam River		25.5	Feasibility studies completed. Cost estimate $234 million.
Hingol Dam	Lasbela District, Hingol River, Balochistan		3.5	Feasibility studies completed. Cost estimate $311 million.
Akhori Dam	Akhori, Punjab, Haro River		600	Feasibility studies ongoing. Cost estimate $1.6 billion.
Katzarah Dam	Skardu, Gilgit-Baltistan		15,000	Proposed.
Middle Palas hydropower project	Kohistan, KPK		373	Feasibility studies ongoing. Cost estimate $763 million.
Upper Palas hydropower project	Kohistan, KPK		160	Feasibility studies ongoing. Cost estimate $763 million.
Madian Hydropower Project	Swat, KPK, Swat River		157	Feasibility studies ongoing.
Shushai-Zhendoli Hydropower Project	Chitral, KPK		144	Financing is being arranged for these projects by selling shares in the existing projects.
Shogosin Hydropower Project	Chitral, KPK		132	Financing is being arranged for these projects by selling shares in the existing projects.
Latambar Dam	Karak District, Khyber Pukhtunkhwa		?	The preliminary feasibility study of the project has been completed and process of site selection completed.
Mairoobi Dam	Nowshera District, Khyber Pukhtunkhwa		?	The preliminary feasibility study of the project has been completed and process of site selection completed.
Jaroba Dam	Nowshera District, Khyber Pukhtunkhwa		?	The preliminary feasibility study of the project has been completed and process of site selection completed.
Naran Dam	Mansehra District, Khyber Pukhtunkhwa		188	EOI invited.
Gorband Hydropower Project	Shangla District, KPK		14	The preliminary feasibility study of the project has been completed and process of site selection completed.
Nand Bahar Dam	Battagram District, Khyber Pukhtunkhwa		50	The preliminary feasibility study of the project has been completed and process of site selection completed.
Mojigram Shagoor Dam	Chitral District, Khyber Pukhtunkhwa		50	The preliminary feasibility study of the project has been completed and process of site selection completed.
Astar Rabooni Dam	Chitral District, Khyber Pukhtunkhwa		50	The preliminary feasibility study of the project has been completed and process of site selection completed.
Arkari Gol Dam	Chitral District, Khyber Pukhtunkhwa		50	The preliminary feasibility study of the project has been completed and process of site selection completed.
Shringal Dam	Upper Dir District, Khyber Pukhtunkhwa		50	The preliminary feasibility study of the project has been completed and process of site selection completed.
Patrak Barikot Dam	Swat District, Khyber Pukhtunkhwa		60	The preliminary feasibility study of the project has been completed and process of site selection completed.
Segokatch Dam	Chitral District, KPK		60	The preliminary feasibility study of the project has been completed and process of site selection completed.
Taunsa Hydropower Project			135	IPP, RFP has been accepted.
Shigo Kas Hydropower Project			102	EOI invited.
Bata Kundi Hydropower Project			96	EOI invited.
Ghorband Khwar Hydropower Project			21	EOI Iinvited.
Nandihar Khwar Hydropower Project			12	EOI invited.
Winder Dam	Lasbela District, Winder River, Balochistan		0.3	Proposed. Cost estimate $148 million.
Daraban Zam Dam	Dera Ismail Khan, KPK, Khora River		0.75	Proposed. Cost estimate $69 million.
Ghabir Dam	Ghabir River		0.15	Proposed. Cost estimate $121 million.
Papin Dam	Rawalpindi District, Wadala Kas		0.3	Proposed. Cost estimate $101 million.
Rajhdani Dam	Kotli District, AJK Poonch River		132	EOI invited.
Gabral Kalam	Kalam, Khyber Pakhtunkhwa		101	LoS issued.
Bhadi Dhoba Hydropower Project	Haveli District		1	Proposed.
Galeter Hydropower Project	Kotli District		1	Proposed.
Saridoa Cross Hydropower Project	Bhimber District		1.7	Proposed.
Chamfall Hydropower Project	Hattian District		6.4	Proposed.
Guddu Hydropower Station	Kashmore, Sindh		33	Proposed.
Harighel Hydropower Project			53	Proposed.
Sehra Hydropower Project	Azad Kashmir, Poonch River		130	Proposed.
Nagdar Hydropower Project	Neelum, AJK, Jagran River		25	Proposed.
Duwarian Hydropower Project	Hattian Bala, AJK, Jagran River		29	Proposed.
Asrit-Kedam Hydropower Project	Kalam, KPK, Swat River		215	LOI issued by PEDO, KPK to Korea's state-owned company, M/S Korea South East Power Company (KOEN) working through KOAK Power Limited.
Karang Hydropower Project			458	Proposed.
Shogo-Sin Hydel Dam			132	Proposed.
Shushgai Zhendoll			144	Proposed.
Yogo, Pakistan			500	Proposed.
Thor Hydropower Project			3.6	Proposed.
Yulbo Hydropower Project			3000	Proposed.
Shyok Dam			640	Proposed.
Tungus Hydropower Project			2200	Proposed.
Skardu Dam	Skardu		1600	Proposed.
Dudhnial Hydropower Project			960	Proposed.
Kundal Shahi Hydropower Project			960	Proposed.
Trappi Hydropower Project			32	Proposed.
Nandihar Hydropower Project	Battagram, Khyber Pukhtunkhwa		10	Proposed.
Mujigaram Shagore Hydropower Project	Chitral, Khyber Pukhtunkhwa		51	Proposed.
Istaro Booni Hydropower Project	Chitral, Khyber Pukhtunkhwa		52	Proposed.
Arkari Gol Hydropower Project	Chitral, Khyber Pukhtunkhwa		79	Proposed.
Total proposed generation			60,764+	

== See also ==
- List of barrages and headworks in Pakistan
- List of power stations in Pakistan
