= Sabakzai Dam =

Dam in Balochistan, Pakistan

- Location of Sabakzai Dam in Balochistan, Pakistan Sabakzai Dam (Pakistan)
- Country: Pakistan
- Location: Zhob, Balochistan
- Coordinates: 30°56′51″N 69°21′23″E
- Status: Operational
- Construction began: 1998
- Opening date: 2007
- Construction cost: Rs. 1960.823 million (US$7.0 million)
- Owner: Government of Balochistan

Dam and spillways
- Type of dam: Earth and rock fill
- Height: 34.75 m (114.0 ft)
- Length: 395 m (1,296 ft)

Reservoir
- Total capacity: 40,335,000 m^{3} (32,700 acre⋅ft)

Sabakzai Dam is an embankment dam on the Sawar Rud, a tributary of Zhob River, about 68 km southwest of Zhob in Balochistan, Pakistan.

The 395 m long dam is earth and rock-fill with a command area of 2,954 ha (7,300 acres). Construction began in 2004 and it was inaugurated by President Pervez Musharraf on 3 September 2007. The irrigation works are still being constructed.

== See also ==
- List of dams and reservoirs in Pakistan
