= Baran Dam =

- Location within Pakistan
- Country: Pakistan
- Location: Bannu, Khyber Pakhtunkhwa
- Coordinates: 33.009651°N 70.502571°E
- Purpose: Irrigation, power
- Status: Completed
- Opening date: 1962
- Owner: WAPDA

Dam and spillways
- Type of dam: Earth core rockfill
- Impounds: Kurrum River and Baran stream
- Height: 39 m (129 ft)
- Length: 490 m (1,620 ft)
- Width (crest): 1275 m

Reservoir
- Total capacity: 123.35 million m^{3}

Power Station
- Operator: WAPDA
- Type: Conventional
- Installed capacity: 5.8 MW
- Annual generation: 10 GWh

Baran Dam, located in the Bannu district of Khyber Pakhtunkhwa, Pakistan, is a medium-sized hydroelectric dam characterized by a low-head design and an earth-core rockfill structure, boasting a capacity of 5.8 megawatts. This dam spans the Kurrum River and Baran stream and serves as a pivotal component within a broader initiative aimed at enhancing agricultural productivity in the southern districts of Khyber Pakhtunkhwa.

The dam was initially commissioned in 1962 during Ayub Khan government. In 2018, a significant upgrade project, known as the "Raising of Baran Dam Project," was initiated with the objective of increasing the dam's height by 7 meters, thereby expanding its total water storage capacity. The estimated cost for this project was 5.2 billion rupees.

== Main uses ==
Upon the construction of the proposed Baran Dam, it will serve as a reservoir for storing floodwaters from the Baran stream and Kurrum river. The reservoir's total storage capacity is approximately 123 million cubic metres (100,000 acre⋅ft). The stored water will be utilized for the development of irrigated agriculture within an expansive command area covering approximately 69,000 hectares (170,000 acres) via the Marwat Canal. Furthermore, this undertaking is expected to generate 5.8 MW of power, contributing to an annual energy output of 36 TJ (10 GW⋅h).

== Other benefits ==
By impeding the flow of the Baran stream, the initiative aims to preserve floodwaters, fostering development in various critical sectors, including irrigated agriculture, power generation, and the provision of potable water for domestic use. Notably, the project is expected to have a positive and widespread impact on the local community by creating employment opportunities and encouraging the growth of businesses. These indirect advantages, such as increased employment and the subsequent enhancement of living standards, are of significant importance, even if they cannot be precisely quantified in monetary terms. Furthermore, the project is poised to substantially stimulate the growth of fisheries in the region, while also offering recreational and employment prospects for the area's residents.

== See also ==
- List of dams and reservoirs in Pakistan
- List of power stations in Pakistan
- Kurrum Garhi Hydropower Plant
- Kurram Tangi Dam
