= Hattar (village) =

Village in Punjab, Pakistan

Hattar is a major village located in Fateh Jang Tehsil, Attock District, Punjab, Pakistan. It is situated on the N-80 National Highway , 10 kilometers before the city of Fateh Jang on the route from Rawalpindi to Kohat.

Located southwest of Rawalpindi city, the village is 40 kilometers from Rawalpindi, 25 kilometers from Islamabad International Airport, and 17 kilometers from the M2 motorway's Fateh Jang Interchange, nestled at the foothills of the Kala Chitta mountain range. The Nandna stream, which passes west of the village, is the only water source. This water has been stored by constructing the Shahpur Dam at the foot of the Kala Chitta hills. The dam is a rich source of fish. On the Rawalpindi–Fateh Jang Road, beside the bridge over the Nandna stream, a recreational spot sells freshly cooked fish from the dam.

== Population and Other Information ==
According to the 2017 census, Hattar has a population of 8,456 people. Most residents are involved in agriculture, while one-third are employed in various occupations. The inhabitants include Bhatti Rajputs, Awan Qutb Shahis, Arain, Kashmiri migrants, Jatts, and other ethnic groups. The entire population is Muslim, and all adhere to the Sunni Hanafi school of thought. The village hosts about a dozen mosques and two religious schools (madrasas) for women. There is one government high school each for boys and girls, along with three private educational institutions. A Basic Health Unit (BHU), established by the government, provides basic healthcare services.

== Illegal housing society ==
In June 2019, Hattar was in the news when local municipal committee authorities declared 58 housing societies operating in Fatehjang illegal for operating without getting government approval. One of the illegal housing societies was in Hattar, identified as Avenue Phase-2 Housing, Hattar. Development and sale of land for residential purposes is unlawful without prior approval from the municipal authorities.
