= Jawa Dam =

Jawa Dam may refer to:

- Jawa Dam, Jordan, the oldest known dam in the world
- Jawa Dam, Pakistan, located near Rawalpindi
