= Shyok =

Shyok may refer to:

- Shyok Dam, a dam on the Shyok River in Gilgit-Baltistan, Pakistan
- Shyok River, a river in northern India and Pakistan
- Shyok Valley, a valley formed by the Shyok River
- Shyok, Ladakh, a village along the Shyok River in Ladakh, India
