= Diamer-Bhasha Dam =

Dam in Gilgit-Baltistan, Pakistan

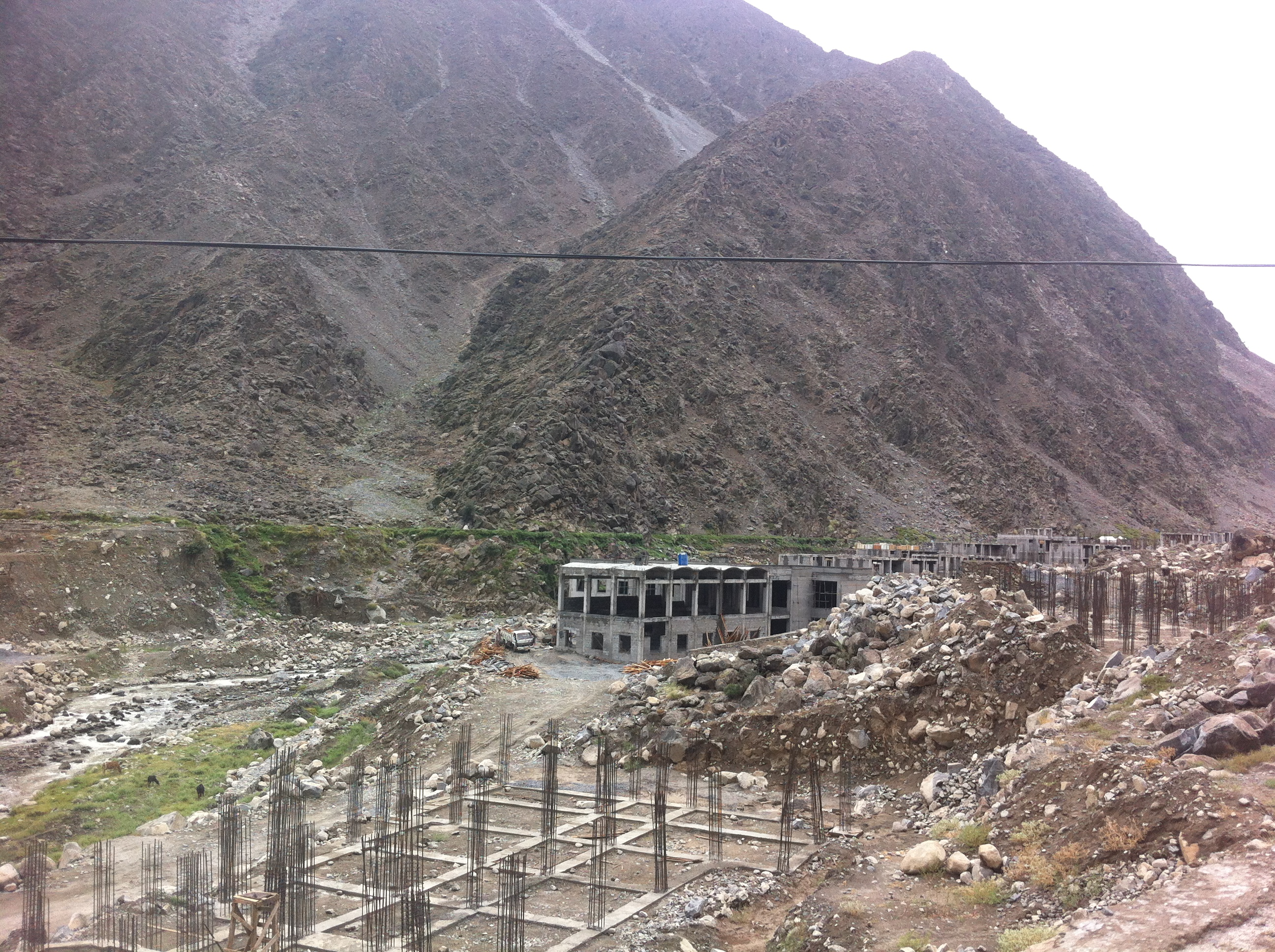

- Gilgit Baltistan
- Country: Pakistan
- Location: Khyber Pakhtunkhwa and Gilgit Baltistan
- Coordinates: 35°31′10.2″N 73°44′21.1″E
- Status: Preliminary construction
- Opening date: 2028 (est.)
- Construction cost: USD 14 billion (2013 est.)
- Owner: WAPDA

Dam and spillways
- Type of dam: Gravity, roller-compacted concrete
- Impounds: Indus River
- Height: 272 m (892 ft)

Reservoir
- Total capacity: 10,000,000,000 m^{3} (8,107,132 acre⋅ft)
- Active capacity: 7,900,000,000 m^{3} (6,404,634 acre⋅ft)

Power Station
- Turbines: 12 x 375 MW
- Installed capacity: 4800 MW
- Annual generation: 19.028 TWh (est.)

Diamer-Bhasha Dam is a concreted-filled gravity dam, in the preliminary stages of construction, on the River Indus between Kohistan district in Khyber Pakhtunkhwa and Diamer district in Gilgit Baltistan, Pakistan administered Kashmir. The dam site is situated near a place called "Bhasha", hence the name which is 40 km downstream of Chilas town and 315 km from Tarbela Dam. The eight million acre feet (MAF) reservoir with 272-metre height will be the tallest roller compact concrete (RCC) dam in the world.

Upon completion, Diamer-Bhasha dam would (i) produce 4800 megawatts of electricity through hydro-power generation; (ii) store an extra 10.5 cubic kilometres (8,500,000 acre⋅ft) of water for Pakistan that would be used for irrigation and drinking; (iii) extend the life of Tarbela Dam located downstream by 35 years; and (iv) control flood damage by the River Indus downstream during high floods.

However, in response to using Basha Dam to sideline the Kalabagh Dam, Engineer Anwer Khurshid has stated that "Bhasha dam is no substitute for Kalabagh dam not because of its altitude which is high enough, but because no irrigation canals can be taken out from it because of the hilly terrain. No canals can be taken out from any dam on the Indus except from Kalabagh Dam."

It is planned to have a height of 272 meters spillway with fourteen gates each 11.5 m × 16.24 m. The gross capacity of the reservoir will be 10 cubic kilometres (8,100,000 acre⋅ft), with a live storage of 7.9 cubic kilometres (6,400,000 acre⋅ft). Originally, two underground powerhouses were proposed: one on each side of the main dam, with six turbines each and a total installed capacity of 4,500 MW. In August 2026, *Briefpk*, citing an alleged leaked government document, reported that the power-generation component had been deferred amid concerns over excess contracted generation capacity and associated capacity payments. The Pakistani government and WAPDA later denied that the power component had been cancelled.

On 13 May 2020, the Pakistani government signed a Rs.442 billion contract with a joint venture of China Power and Frontier Works Organisation (FWO) for the construction of the dam. The eight million acre feet (MAF) reservoir with 272-metre height will be the tallest roller compact concrete (RCC) dam in the world.

Long-term challenges facing the project since its inception, include securing funding from international lenders, groups such as the World Bank, Asian Development Bank and IMF were unwilling to lend because the dam was in territory disputed by Pakistan and India. However, the government of Imran Khan addressed these financial challenges in 2021 by issuing Pakistan's first-ever green bond, the bond received an emphatic response from investors as it was oversubscribed with 4 times greater number of investors willing to invest than required, raising $500 million of capital for this project.

== Background ==
In January 2006, the Government of Pakistan under President Pervez Musharraf announced the decision to construct 5 multi-purpose storage dams in the country during next 10–12 years. According to the plan, the Diamer-Bhasha Dam project was proposed to be built in the first phase. In November 2008, the executive committee of National Economic Council formally approved the project. Council of Common Interests Pakistan, a constitutional body representing the provinces, also approved the construction of the dam. The Prime Minister of Pakistan laid the foundation stone of the project on 18 October 2011.

== Timelines ==
- In 1980, construction of the dam was suggested.
- In 2004, the first feasibility report was prepared.
- In 2008, a revised feasibility report was prepared.
- In 2020, Contract was awarded for the construction.

The construction work will take approximate 9 years.

== Construction and financial matters ==
In November 2008, the cost of the Diamer-Bhasha dam was estimated at $12.6 billion. and it will have a storage capacity of 10 cubic kilometres (8,100,000 acre⋅ft). However, it will have a power generation capacity of 4500 megawatts.

An amount of Rs 27 billion is required for the acquisition of land and resettlement of the people to be affected in the wake of the construction of the dam. Under the proposed project, Rs 10.76 billion will be spent for the acquisition of agriculture-barren land, tree and nurseries and Rs 1.638 billion to be utilized for properties and infrastructure, Rs 8.8 billion for establishment of nine model villages, Rs 62,119 million for pay and allowances for administrative arrangements, and Rs 17.7 million for contingent administrative expenses. The project also includes an escalation cost of Rs 2.234 billion at the rate of 6 per cent per year for five years and interest of Rs 4.309 billion during the implementation at the rate of 9 per cent.

Detailed drawings of the dam were completed by March 2008. As of August 2012, the project faced several setbacks due to major sponsors backing out from financing the project, as World Bank and Asian Development Bank both refused to finance the project as according to them its location is in disputed territory and asked Pakistan to get a NOC from neighboring India.

On 20 August 2013, the Finance Minister of Pakistan, Ishaq Dar claimed to have convinced the World Bank and the Aga Khan Development Network to finance the Diamer-Bhasha Project without the requirement of NOC from India. He also said that the Asian Development Bank, Aga Khan Rural Support Programme and Aga Khan Foundation had agreed to become lead finance manager for the project.

On 27 August 2013, Pakistan's Finance Minister, Ishaq Dar said that work would start on both Dasu and Diamer-Bhasha Dams simultaneously. He also said that Diamer-Bhasha project would take 10–12 years to complete.

On 7 November 2013, the Chairman of Water and Power Development Authority Syed Raghib Abbas Shah claimed that his department has received 17,000 acres of land at the cost of PKR 5.5 billion from Government of Gilgit-Baltistan and the Ismaili Community for the construction of the project.

Former Prime Minister Nawaz Sharif on 5 December 2016 approved, in principle, the financing plan for the Diamer-Bhasha dam and ordered the secretary of water and power to start physical work on the dam before the end of 2017.

On 14 November 2017, Pakistan dropped its bid to have the dam financed under the China-Pakistan Economic Corridor framework as China placed strict conditions including on the ownership of the project. China had projected the cost of the dam to be $14 billion and to secure its investment China wanted Pakistan to pledge another operational dam to it.

On 4 July 2018, the Supreme Court of Pakistan directed the government to begin construction on the dam, as well as the Mohmand Dam, to resolve a water shortage. Chief Justice Saqib Nisar of the court gave a donation of 1 million Pakistani rupees for the construction of the two dams. And set up a fund for the construction of the dam. On 6 July, the government of Pakistan set up a fund for the construction of the Diamer Bhasha Dam. Fundraising through bank accounts and cellular companies was initiated for participation.

On 9 September 2018, a Water and Power Development Authority official revealed that at least 12 billion dollars are required to build Diamer-Bhasha Dam. 5 billion dollars are required to build infrastructure while another 7 billion dollars are required for the power generation.

On 1 November 2018, PM-CJP fund for Diamer-Bhasha and Mohmand Dams which was opened in beginning of 3rd Quarter of 2018 i.e. in January 2019 its funds have reached US$66.7 million (i.e. PKR 9.29 billion) approximately. The status is regularly updated on the Supreme Court of Pakistan.

On 2 April 2020, it was revealed by WAPDA that Rs115.9 billion had been distributed for land acquisition of the project till February 2020.

On 13 May 2020, the Pakistani government signed a Rs.442 billion contract with a joint venture of China Power and Frontier Works Organisation (FWO) for the construction of the dam.

== Design ==
The project is located on Indus River, about 315 km upstream of Tarbela Dam, 165 km downstream of the Northern Area capital Gilgit and 40 km downstream of Chilas.

- Main Dam:
  - Maximum Height: 272 meters
  - Type: roller compacted concrete (RCC)
- Diversion System:
  - Tunnels: 2
  - Canals: 1
  - Cofferdam: Upstream and Downstream
- Main Spillway:
  - Gates: 9
  - Size: 16.5×15.0 m
- Reservoir Level: 1160 m
- Min Operation Level Elevation: 1060 m
- Gross Capacity: 9 cubic kilometres (7,300,000 acre⋅ft)
- Live Capacity: 7.9 cubic kilometres (6,400,000 acre⋅ft)
- Outlets:
  - Intermediate Level:8
  - Low Level: 4
- Powerhouses:
  - No. of Powerhouses: 2
  - Total Installed Capacity: 4500 MW
  - Location of Powerhouses: one each on right and left side
  - No. of Generator Units: 8
  - Capacity/Unit: 560 MW
  - Average Power Generation; 16,500 GWh
- Estimated Cost: US $14 Billion (2013 Estimate)

== Purpose and function ==
The Diamer Basha Dam is designed to provide 8.1 million acre-feet (MAF) of water storage (about 6.4 MAF live storage), regulate the Indus River for irrigation and drinking supply, and generate 4,500 MW of hydropower producing approximately 18,100 GWh annually, thereby reducing reliance on thermal energy; it will also mitigate downstream flooding, support national development, and create thousands of jobs while improving infrastructure and living standards.

In addition it is also expected to extend the life of Tarbela Dam located downstream by 35 years by reducing sedimentation.

== Environmental impact and resettlement ==
Environmental Impact:

- Villages affected: 31
- Houses affected: 4100
- Population affected: 35,000
- Agricultural land submerged: 6.1 square kilometres (1,500 acres)
- Area under reservoir: 100 square kilometres (25,000 acres)

Resettlement:

- Proposed new settlements: 9 model villages.
- Population resettled: 28,000
- New infrastructure, roads, clean water supply schemes, schools, health centres, electricity supply, etc.
- Development of new tourism industry in area around reservoir (including hotels, restaurants, water sports, etc.).
- Development of hitherto non-existent fresh-water fishing industry based on newly created reservoir.

== Heritage issues ==
The dam will submerge heritage including rock carvings/petroglyphs dating as far back as 6th millennium BC. Locals say that these are not only of great historical significance for Buddhists but also for promoting tourism and need to relocate to safe side.

== Controversies ==
The Diamer Bhasha Dam has been mired in controversy due to the dam fund launched by former Chief Justice of Pakistan (CJP) Saqib Nisar in July 2018. The fund, which was later joined by the then Prime Minister Imran Khan, was intended to collect donations for the construction of the Diamer Bhasha and Mohmand dams. However, the Public Accounts Committee (PAC) of Parliament summoned Nisar to provide explanations regarding the fund, which had received Rs 10 billion till March 2019. What was collected. Furthermore, the fund was seen as an exercise in judicial overreach, with Nisar's actions during his tenure, including the initiation of the fund, being seen as controversial.

== See also ==
- List of dams and reservoirs in Pakistan
- Indus Waters Treaty
- Katzarah Dam
