= Tangir Hydropower Project =

Tangir Hydropower Plant
- Location within Pakistan
- Official name: Tangir Hydropower Plant
- Location: Chilas, Gilgit-Baltistan, Pakistan
- Coordinates: 35°36′06.73″N 73°29′45.44″E
- Status: Proposed
- Owner: Water and Power Development Authority (WAPDA)

Dam and spillways
- Type of dam: run-of-the-river
- Impounds: Tangir River

Tangir Hydroelectric Plant
- Operator: WAPDA
- Commission date: Proposed
- Turbines: 3 x 5 MW (Pelton-type)
- Installed capacity: 15 MW
- Annual generation: 112.34 million units (GWh)

Tangir Hydropower Plant (THPP) is a proposed (Expression of Interest for Development phase) small, low-head, run-of-the-river hydroelectric power generation station of 15 megawatt generation capacity (three units of 5 MW each), located on the left bank of Tangir River in Gilgit-Baltistan province of Pakistan about 30 km downstream of Diamer-Bhasha Dam and 430 km from Islamabad. The project area is accessible from Chilas by Karakoram Highway and a jeepable road leads to the project area.

Pakistan Water and Power Development Authority (WAPDA) intends to develop the 15 MW Tangir Hydropower Project under the Public Private Partnership (PPP) mode. The project would be implemented under the "Policy for Power Generation Projects- 2002" and would revert to the Government of Pakistan after the concession period. The Government of Pakistan/ Government of Gilgit-Baltistan/ WAPDA would provide up to one third of the equity in the Partnership. It is located at 35°26'N 74°05'E. It is a small hydel power generating plant proposed to be constructed and put in commercial operation with the Average Annual generating capacity of 112.34 million units (GWh) of least expensive electricity.

== Salient Features ==
Weir Elevation: 1430 m
Powerhouse Elevation: 1215 m
Catchments Area: 740 km2
Mean Annual Discharge: 24.52 m3/s
Design Discharge: 8.70 m3/s
Gross Head: 215 m
Net Head: 202.9 m
Capacity: 15.0 MW
Mean Annual Energy: 112.34 GWh
Plant Factor: 85.5 %
Headrace tunnel length: 3340 m
Penstock/pressure shaft: 350 m, 1.75 m
No. & Type of Turbine: 3 Pelton-type, 500 rpm
Total Project Cost with IDC: $30.967 Million
Cost/KWh: 4.29 US cent
EIRR: 35.0 %
FIRR: 22.56 %
B/C Ratio: 2.23

== Current status ==
The project has been identified by HPO and a Pre-feasibility study is in progress.

== See also ==
- List of dams and reservoirs in Pakistan
- List of power stations in Pakistan
