= Burj Aziz Khan Dam =

Dam in Balochistan, Pakistan

- Country: Pakistan
- Location: Balochistan
- Status: In use
- Construction cost: $291 million
- Owner(s): Government of Balochistan

Burj Aziz Khan Dam is located near Quetta in Balochistan, Pakistan. It was constructed at a cost of $291 million to supply water to Quetta.

== See also ==
- List of dams and reservoirs in Pakistan
