= Darawat Dam =

Dam in Jamshoro, Sindh, Pakistan

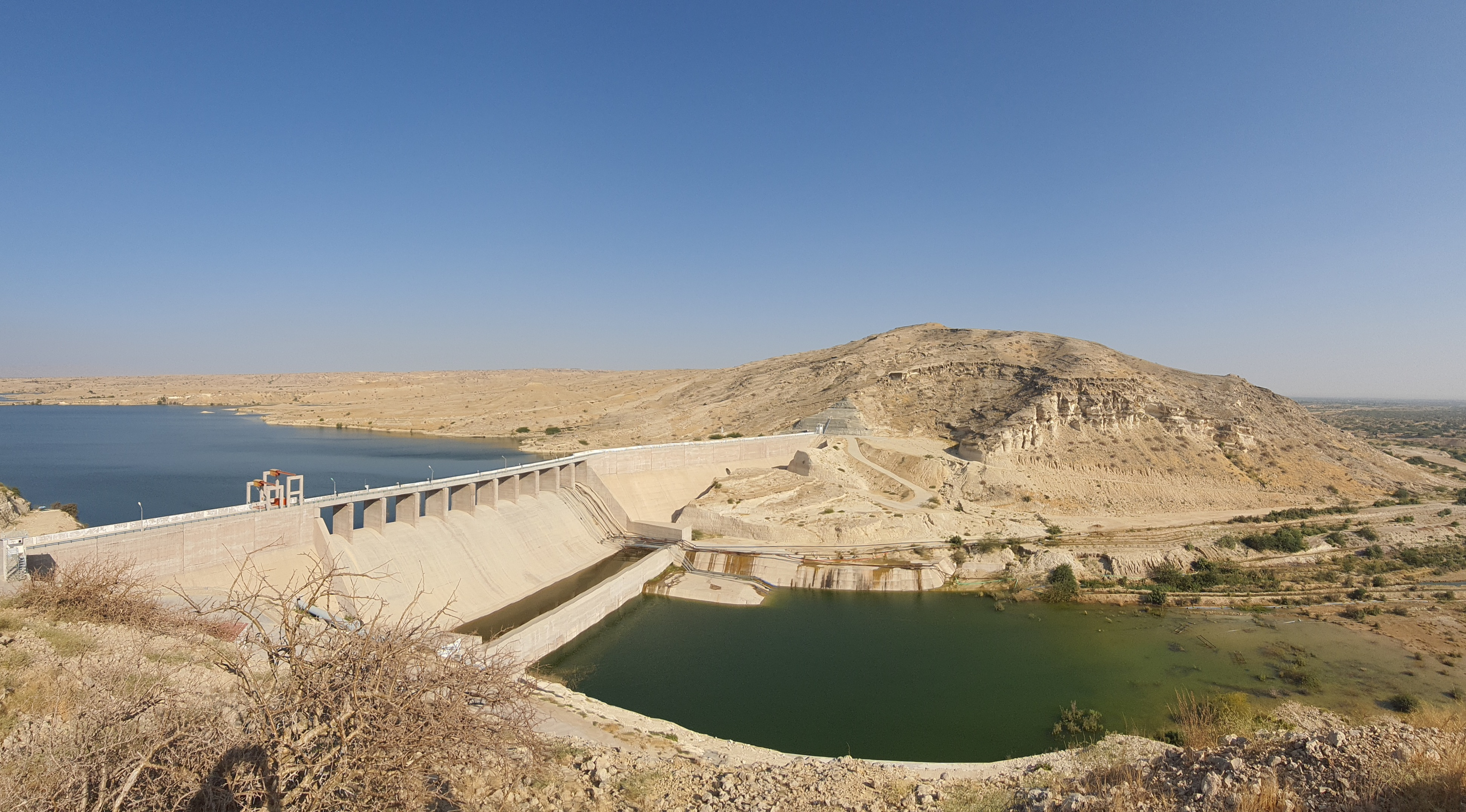
- Darawat Dam in December 2020
- Interactive map of Darawat Dam
- Country: Pakistan
- Location: Jamshoro District, Sindh
- Coordinates: 25°24′33.4″N 67°56′33.3″E
- Status: Operational
- Construction began: 2010
- Opening date: August 2014
- Construction cost: PKR 9.4 billion
- Owner: Government of Pakistan
- Operator: WAPDA

Dam and spillways
- Type of dam: Concrete gravity
- Height: 46 m (151 ft)
- Length: 306 m (1,004 ft)

Reservoir
- Total capacity: 150,000,000 m^{3} (120,000 acre⋅ft)
- Active capacity: 110,000,000 m^{3} (89,000 acre⋅ft)
- Inactive capacity: 40,000,000 m^{3} (32,000 acre⋅ft)
- Catchment area: 8,161 km^{2} (3,151 mi^{2}; 2,017,000 acres)

Darawat Dam is concrete gravity dam across Nai Baran River near the village of Jhangri in Jamshoro District of Sindh, Pakistan.

Construction of dam started in March 2010 and its completion was inaugurated by the President of Pakistan, Asif Ali Zardari, on 9 March 2013. Its estimated cost was PKR 9.3 Billion.

The dam is 250 metres (820 ft) in length and 43 metres (141 ft) in height, and can store about 150 million cubic metres (120,000 acre ft) of water to help irrigate 10,000 hectares (25,000 acres) of land.

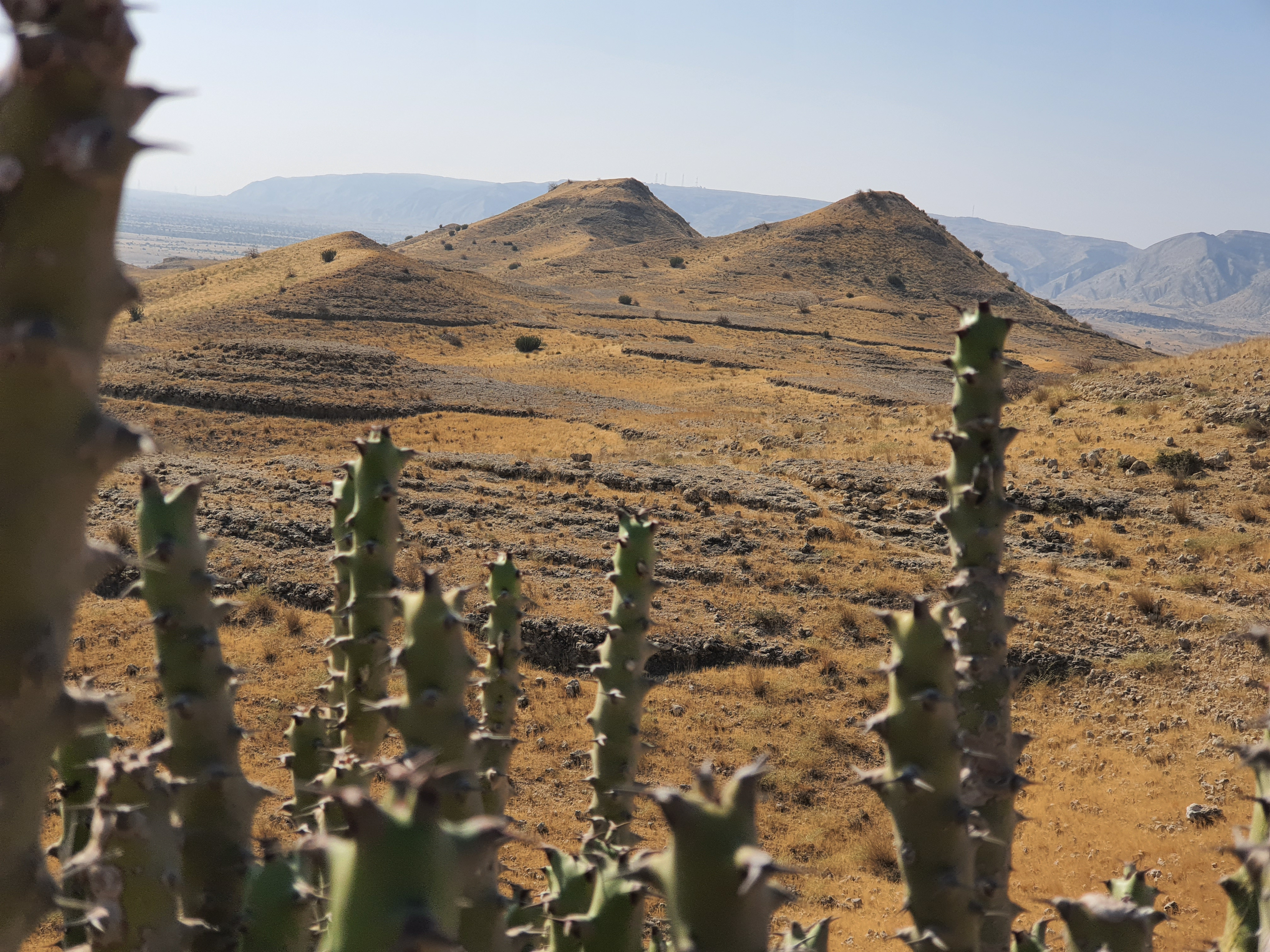
Mountains near Darawat Dam

== See also ==
- List of dams and reservoirs in Pakistan
- List of power stations in Pakistan
