= Kalabagh Dam =

Proposed Dam in Kalabagh, Mianwali District in Punjab

- Location within Pakistan
- Official name: کالا باغ ڈيم
- Country: Pakistan
- Location: Kalabagh, Mianwali District
- Coordinates: 32°57′23″N 071°36′49″E
- Status: Not Started
- Construction began: TBA
- Opening date: TBA
- Construction cost: TBA

Dam and spillways
- Type of dam: Earthfill dam (zoned fill embankment with clay core)
- Impounds: Indus River
- Height: 83 m (272 ft)
- Length: 500 m (1,640 ft)

Reservoir
- Active capacity: 7.52 km^{3} (6,100,000 acre⋅ft)
- Inactive capacity: 9.7 km^{3} (7,900,000 acre⋅ft)
- Catchment area: 110,500 sq mi (286,000 km^{2})

Power Station
- Hydraulic head: 170 ft (52 m)
- Turbines: 12 x 300 MW
- Installed capacity: 3,600 MW (max. planned)
- Annual generation: 11,400 GWh

The Kalabagh Dam (Urdu: کالا باغ ڈيم) is a proposed hydroelectric dam on the Indus River at Kalabagh in the Mianwali District of Punjab, Pakistan. The dam, first proposed in 1950s, has been intensely debated along ethnic and regional lines for several decades.

If constructed, the dam could generate 3,600 megawatts(MW) of electricity. It is also suggested and promoted as a potential solution to the chronic flooding problem and the related water crises in the country. Over the decades, the understanding of the environmental impacts of mega dam projects have grown, and Pakistan Economy Watch has demanded a national debate on the KBD issue.

== History ==
After the construction of Tarbela Dam and Mangla Dam, Kalabagh became the highest priority dam project. In 1979, the government obtained a grant of $25 million from the UNDP for its preparation, detailed design and feasibility. Pakistan first approached the Soviet Union for financing assistance, but due to strained relations with Afghanistan (a Soviet ally), this request was denied. The government then approached the World Bank, which agreed to finance the project. At this point in Pakistan's history, previous dam projects such as Mangla (under Ayub Khan) and Tarbela (under Zulfikar Ali Bhutto) never faced any opposition. Even Kalabagh was approved by the Central Development Working Party, without dissent.

The issue of Kalabagh started to become politicized after the execution of the former Prime Minister Zulfikar Ali Bhutto, a highly popular leader from the downstream province of Sindh. Adding to the controversy, was the feud between Zia-ul-Haq and his own NWFP governor Fazl e Haq, which eventually dragged in the Awami National Party into the opposing camp. Due to certain violations of the Indus Accord by the Punjab province, reservations in Sindh grew against the project, whose population and political leaders now painted it as a conspiracy.

Despite the political roadblocks, the World Bank and foreign consultants continued their work on Kalabagh, over a period of ten years, up to 1986 when the project was finally put on hold. The suspicions of the Sindhis grew after Benazir Bhutto's government was dismissed in favor of Nawaz Sharif (from Punjab).There is debate on whether Benazir favored the Kalabagh project. Pir Pagar has claimed the dam was originally conceived by her father, and that Benazir had allocated funds for it. Others like Sharjeel Memon have claimed Benazir was against its construction.

In December 2004, Pervez Musharraf announced that he would re-initiate the Kalabagh project to serve the larger interest of Pakistan. However, on 26 May 2008, the Federal Minister for Water and Power of Pakistan, Raja Pervez Ashraf, said that the "Kalabagh Dam would not be constructed" and that the project had been cancelled due to "opposition from Khyber Pakhtunkhwa, Sindh and other stakeholders, the project was no longer feasible". In 2010 after the worst floods in Pakistani history, the Prime Minister of Pakistan, Yousaf Raza Gilani, stated flood damage would be minimized if the Kalabagh Dam were built.

== Arguments Supporting Construction ==
A study funded by National University of Science and Technology in 2014, concluded that building Kaalabagh would offer the following benefits: (1) Annual savings of $4 billion in energy costs (2) Saving Rs. 132 billion due to irrigation benefits and (3) Prevent flood-loss damage, such as the $45 billion loss suffered in recent floods at the time the study was published. The study estimated that the overall benefits of Kalabagh would provide 87 million dollars every year, and thus the cost of construction would be repaid within 8–9 years. Moreover, according to the study, the negative consequences of not building Kalabagh are as follows: (1) Economic destabilization due to food shortage, (2) "Serious drop" in agricultural production, (3) Rise in inter-provincial disputes over water, (4) Additional cost of importing energy, (5) Prohibitive cost of electricity for the average consumer and (6) Effects on industry and agriculture due to rising electricity costs.

Bashir A. Malik, former chief technical advisor to the United Nations and World Bank, said, "Sindh and Pakhtunkhwah would become drought areas in the years to come if Kalabagh Dam was not built." At the same time, former KP Chief Minister Shamsul Mulk has stated that the "Kalabagh Dam would be helpful in erasing poverty from Khyber-Pakhtunkhwa, as it would irrigate 800,000 acres of cultivable land that is located 100–150 feet above the level of River Indus." The Kalabagh Dam would provide 6.5 million acre feet of water to cultivate seven million acres of currently barren land in addition to the 3,600 megawatts (4,800,000 hp) of electricity it would provide. In response to the push towards side-lining Kalabagh altogether in favour of the rival Basha Dam project, Engineer Anwer Khurshid stated that "Basha Dam is no substitute for Kalabagh Dam, not because of its altitude, which is high enough, but because no irrigation canals can be taken out from it because of the hilly terrain."

Experts who supported the construction of the Kalabagh Dam at the 2012 "Save Water Save Pakistan" Forum included: Dr Salman Shah, former Finance Minister of Pakistan; Abdul Majeed Khan, TECH Society president; Shafqat Masood, former IRSA chairman; Qayyum Nizami, former Minister of State; Prof Abdul Qayyum Qureshi, former Vice-Chancellor of Islamia University, Bahawalpur; Dr Muhammad Sadiq, agricultural scientist; M Saeed Khan, former GM of Kalabagh Dam Project; Engr. Mahmudur Rehman Chughtai, Mansoor Ahmed, former MD of Pakistan Atomic Energy Commission Foundation, M. Zubair Sheikh and Jameel Gishkori, among others. The participants of Save Water Save Pakistan demanded the construction of five dams, including the Munda Dam, Kurram Tangi Dam, Akhori Dam and the Kalabagh Dam, at by 2025 at the latest to store water and generate electricity to meet demand.

Initially when the project was being conceived, engineering studies conducted by an independent Panel of Experts were also constituted by the World Bank, to progressively review the consultants work and to advise them. Members of this panel were eminent world experts and were drawn from different countries. Additional specialists were invited for giving their views on selected topics, where needed. An independent review panel was also constituted by the Government of Pakistan, consisting of eminent Pakistani engineers to review the Project Planning Report. Among them were Manzoor Ahmed Sheikh, Asghar Ali Abidi and Shah Nawaz Khan. This panel also agreed with the conclusions of the Report and supported its recommendations.

== Opposition to Kalabagh ==
Kalabagh dam is opposed by major political parties of Sindh and Kyber Pakhtunkhwah such as PTI, ANP, JUI(F) and PPP. The government from time to time tries to form a consensus on the issue. The former leader of the opposition in the National Assembly Syed Khurshid Ahmed Shah showed objection to the site of Kalabagh Dam and said it is a threat to small provinces. The former Chief Minister of KPK Pervez Khattak said that the KBD is against the interests of KP. Awami National Party has opposed the construction and site of KBD. Sustainable Development Policy Institute, an NGO, published a case study on Kalabagh dam in 1999, mainly arguing against the environmental and displacement impact of building large dams. Muttahida Qaumi Movement (MQM) former chief Altaf Hussain conditionally supported the Kalabagh dam and said that government should address the reservations of Sindhis before its construction. Sindh is opposing Kalabagh Dam over River Indus because the province is located at the end and its entire economy and water needs depend on the flow of the River Indus. Sindhi people fear that the Kalabagh Dam would further reduce the water flow in Indus as according to the proposed design two irrigation canals would be constructed along with the Dam. This would result in almost no water flow downstream Kotri Barrage on Indus. Moreover, the famous Kalabagh Dam commission led by A.G.N Kazi set up by former Military dictator General Pervaiz Musharraf had also opposed the construction of the dam because water is not available in Indus for most of the time. The Kazi Commission has also endorsed the IUCN estimates that the annual requirements for outflow of Indus water to sea for environmental sustenance to be 27 million acre feet (MAF). Sea intrusion due to a reduction in river water below Kotri Barrage has destroyed Indus Delta. According to estimates sea intrusion has caused loss of 2.3 million acres of agricultural land.

== See also ==
- List of dams and reservoirs in Pakistan
- List of power stations in Pakistan
- Indus Waters Treaty
- Katzarah Dam
