= Dhok Talian Dam =

- Location: Dhok Talian in Chakwal District, Punjab, Pakistan
- Status: In use
- Opening date: 1994
- Construction cost: PKR 20.13 million

Dam and spillways
- Type of dam: Zoned earth and rock-filled
- Impounds: Kuthan Kas of Bunha River
- Height: 83.45 ft (25 m)
- Length: 480 ft (146 m)
- Width (crest): 20 ft (6 m)
- Spillway type: Open channel
- Spillway capacity: 5,159.0 cu ft/s (146 m^{3}/s)

Reservoir
- Total capacity: 1,808.0 acre⋅ft (2,230,135 m^{3})
- Active capacity: 1,110 acre⋅ft (1,369,165 m^{3})
- Catchment area: 20.76 km^{2} (5,130 acres)

Dhok Talian Dam is located near village Dhok Talian 20 km from Chakwal District Punjab, Pakistan. The dam is 83.45 ft (25 m) high and has a gross reservoir capacity of 1,938,000 m^{3} (1,571 acre⋅ft).

The dam was completed in 2001 at a cost of PKR 20.13 million. The reservoir has a gross command area of 323.88 km^{2} (80,032 acres).

== See also ==
List of dams and reservoirs in Pakistan
