= Mangi Dam, Pakistan =

Dam in Balochistan, Pakistan

Mangi Dam
- Location of Mangi Dam in Balochistan, Pakistan Mangi Dam (Pakistan)
- Country: Pakistan
- Location: Harnai District, Balochistan
- Coordinates: 30°35′59″N 67°49′59″E
- Status: under construction
- Construction cost: 35 m USD
- Owner: Government of Balochistan

Mangi Dam is located in Harnai District on the Chappar Rift in Balochistan, Pakistan. The dam is still under construction and has a height of 18 m (59 ft) and a storage capacity of 130,000 m^{3} (105 acre⋅ft). In 2015, it was announced that the dam would produce electricity and that the shortage of load shedding would reduce. However, due to security concerns and reports of corruption and mismanagement, the project remains unfinished.

== Mangi Dam and Water Conveyance System Project ==
At an estimated cost Rs 9.85 billion would be launched in order to meet water supply requirement of Quetta city and adjoining areas. According to sources, the Ministry of Water and Power prepared the PC-1 of the project and referred it to the Ministry of Planning, Development and Reforms. The project envisages: (i) providing about 8.10 MGD for augmenting the existing under stress water requirements of Quetta Town, (ii) shifting the existing trend of extracting underground water by means of tube wells to more sustainable option of constructing the surface water storage reservoirs, (iii) providing un-interrupted drinking water supplies to the inhabitants of Quetta Town by means of Construction of Water Storage Tanks in Quetta Valley, (iv) uplifting the livelihood of inhabitants by providing employment and business opportunities during construction phase of the project, (v) mitigating the impacts of floods D/S of proposed Dam site. According to PC-1 of the project, the federal and Balochistan governments would share the cost of the project equally. The project would be completed within 36 months after its approval.

== See also ==
- List of dams and reservoirs in Pakistan
