= Dargai Pal Dam =

Dam in Khyber Pakhtunkhwa, Pakistan

- Location within Khyber Pakhtunkhwa Location within Pakistan
- Country: Pakistan
- Location: South Waziristan, Khyber Pakhtunkhwa
- Coordinates: 32°10′24.37″N 69°42′53.18″E
- Status: Operational
- Construction began: 2008
- Opening date: 2010
- Construction cost: PKR 204 million
- Owner: Government of Pakistan

Dam and spillways
- Type of dam: Earth Filled
- Height: 84 ft (26 m)
- Length: 764 ft (233 m)

Reservoir
- Total capacity: 2178 acre feet

Dargai Pal Dam is an earth filled dam in South Waziristan district of Khyber Pakhtunkhwa, Pakistan.

The construction of dam was started in 2008 and completed in 2010 at a cost of PKR 204 million. The dam has a height of 26 m, covered a length of around 233 m, with actual storage capacity of water 2178 acre feet.

The dam was constructed under supervision of FATA Development Authority. For construction supervision the services of NESPAK were hired.

== See also ==
- List of dams and reservoirs in Pakistan
