= Periano Ghundai =

Archeological site in Zhob, Balochistan

- پېريانو غونډۍ (Pashto)
- Type: Archaeological mound
- Location: Zhob district, Balochistan, Pakistan

History
- Built: 4300 BC

Periano Ghundai (Pashto: پېريانو غونډۍ) meaning "The Hill of Fairies" was an archaeological mound located in the Zhob district in Balochistan, Pakistan. The site is located 3 kilometres (1.9 mi) west of the town of Zhob. It was excavated in 1924 by Sir Aurel Stein and showed great resemblance to the Harappan culture.

It is located along the Zhob River which forms a part of the Indus River basin.

== Archaeology ==
Periano Ghundai was settled as early as 4300 BC, along with several other similar sites in Baluchistan.

The number of settlements known in Baluchistan and in the adjacent lowlands had greatly increased by around 4300 BC, and they included important settlements such as Periano Ghundai (in the Zhob Valley), Mundigak (in the Kandahar region), Faiz Mohammad (in the Quetta Valley), Togau (in the Sarawan region), and Sheri Khan Tarakai (in the Bannu basin).

These developments were taking place during Mehrgarh period III.

== Togau phase ==
Pre-Harappan Togau phase - main sites (triangles)

In a later period, Periano Ghundai belongs to the Togau phase in Baluchistan. Togau ware is dated 3500-3000 BC. It was first defined by Beatrice de Cardi in 1948. Togau is a large mound in the Chhappar Valley of Sarawan, 12 kilometer northwest of Kalat in Baluchistan.

Togau is a fine black-painted pottery which originated in southern Afghanistan (Mundigak region) and eastern Balochistan (Kachi-Bolan region). Later, it spread to central/southern Balochistan (Surab, Jhalawan, and Makran regions) and the Indus Valley (Amri).

Togau ceramics are decorated with animal designs. They were made with potter's wheel from the start. The earliest Togau Phase A ceramics feature detailed and realistic outlines of ibexes, goats or birds. But later stages feature more abstract depictions.

Decoration of Togau ware found at Mehrgarh; four historical stages of development.

According to Jarrige et al (2011), four stages have been defined in the evolution of the Togau pottery. This tradition started to develop in the 5th millennium BC and continued up to mid-4th millennium (3500 BC).

According to Beatrice de Cardi, Togau A style was found in Mehrgarh III, Togau B-C were found in Mehrgarh IV, and Togau D style was found in Mehrgah V.

Togau and Kili Ghul Mohammad wares are closely related. Traditionally, they are considered as the first painted pottery styles in Balochistan.

== Ceramics ==
Periano Ghundai painted ware is distinguished by black-on-red slip decorations. Geometric motifs predominate and are similar to those on Faiz Muhammad and Quetta ware potteries of the Damb Sadat phase. Thus, there seem to be cultural connections between Periano Ghundai and Damb Sadat phases.

Although similar, Faiz Muhammad painted ware is characterized by black-on-grey slip decorations.

Periano Ghundai site was completely destroyed by the locals sometime after 1950.

== See also ==
- List of archaeological sites and monuments in Balochistan
