= Changhoz Dam =

Dam in Khyber Pakhtunkhwa, Pakistan

- Country: Pakistan
- Location: Khyber Pakhtunkhwa
- Status: In-use

Dam and spillways
- Height: 43 m (141 ft)

Reservoir
- Total capacity: 6,000,000 m^{3} (4,864 acre⋅ft)

Changhoz Dam is a large dam near Karak in Khyber Pakhtunkhwa, Pakistan. The dam was completed in 2007 and has a height of 43 m (141 ft) and a storage capacity of 6,000,000 m^{3} (4,864 acre⋅ft).

== Location ==
The dam is located on the Changhoz river which is tributary of Khurram river, just 3 KM away from latamber town, district karak of Khyber Pakhtunkhwa province.

== See also ==
- List of dams and reservoirs in Pakistan
