= Sukleji Dam =

Dam in Balochistan, Pakistan

- Country: Pakistan
- Location: Kachhi District, Balochistan
- Status: Under construction
- Construction cost: US$ 63 Million
- Owner: Government of Balochistan

Dam and spillways
- Type of dam: Zoned earth-filled dam
- Height: 110 ft (34 m)

Reservoir
- Total capacity: 42000 AF

Power Station
- Installed capacity: 0.16 MW

Sukleji Dam is a proposed dam, to be located across Sukleji River in Kachhi District of Balochistan Province, in southwestern Pakistan.

== Specifications ==
The zoned earth-filled dam will be used for irrigation and hydro power generation and will have an installed capacity of 0.16 MW. The dam will have gross storage of 52,000,000 cubic metres (42,000 acre⋅ft) and a command area of 4,900 hectares (12,000 acres).

== See also ==
- List of dams and reservoirs in Pakistan
