= Badin Zai Dam =

Dam in Zhob, Balochistan, Pakistan

Badin ZaiDam
- Country: Pakistan
- Location: Zhob District, Balochistan
- Purpose: Power
- Status: Proposed
- Construction cost: Rs. 305.271
- Operator: WAPDA

Dam and spillways
- Type of dam: Earth fill and Rock-fill dam
- Impounds: Zhob River
- Height (foundation): 80 ft

Badin Zai Dam (بند بادین زئی) is a proposed dam to be built across Zhob River located in Zhob District, Balochistan, Pakistan.
