= Akra Kaur Dam =

Dam in Pakistan

- Location of Akra Kaur Dam in Balochistan, Pakistan Akra Kaur Dam (Pakistan)
- Country: Pakistan
- Location: Gwadar District, Balochistan
- Coordinates: 25°21′29″N 62°16′44″E
- Status: Operational
- Opening date: 1995
- Construction cost: $24 million
- Owner: Government of Balochistan

Akra Kaur Dam, sometimes also referred to as Ankara Kaur Dam, is located near Gawadar in Balochistan, Pakistan. The dam was constructed in 1995 at a cost of $24 million to supply water to Gwadar and adjoining villages. It is the sole source of water supply to residents of the Gwadar District area. The dam contains a volume of water equal to 17,025 acre-feet, 21,000 megalitres, to provide 6100 m^{3} (1.6 million gal) daily.

The dam's dead storage level is 27 metres, below which is 6,500,440 m^{3} (5,270 acre⋅ft) of water, and its live storage level maximum is 32 metres. As of February 2018, it has silted up to 26.3 metres, and the government is investigating a de-silting operation.

In 2005, torrential rain in the area caused an overflow from the dam, inundating a number of villages and claiming at least 20 lives. In July 2012, reports emerged that the dam had dried up completely due to large-scale siltation. This has posed serious water supply challenges to local residents, including acute shortage of drinking water.

In May 2017, Akra Dam ran dry. During that time, Gwadar city's sole water supply was brought from Mirani Dam via tanker truck, at a cost of Rs.220 million per month for 4900—6800 m^{3} (1.3—1.8 million gal) a day. The water was "drinkable but unsafe". A promised water treatment system was not organised. Truck drivers periodically struck due to long delayed wages, interrupting supply.

== See also ==
- List of dams and reservoirs in Pakistan
