= Sukleji River =

River in Balochistan, Pakistan

Coordinates: 28°47′N 67°24′E

Sukleji River is a river in Balochistan Province, in southwestern Pakistan.

== Sukleji Dam ==
Sukleji Dam is a proposed dam located across Sukleji River in the Kachhi District of Balochistan.

== See also ==
- Rivers of Balochistan
- Geography of Balochistan, Pakistan
