= Dandy Dam =

Dam in Khyber Pakhtunkhwa, Pakistan

- Location within Pakistan
- Country: Pakistan
- Location: North Waziristan Agency, Khyber Pakhtunkhwa
- Coordinates: 33°03′49.21″N 70°00′26.66″E
- Status: Operational
- Construction began: 2008
- Opening date: 2011
- Construction cost: PKR 553 million
- Owner: Government of Pakistan

Dam and spillways
- Type of dam: Earth Filled
- Height: 101 ft (31 m)
- Length: 1,764 ft (538 m)

Reservoir
- Total capacity: 3,585,726 m3
- Catchment area: 176 km2

Dandy Dam is small earth-filled dam in what was previously the North Waziristan District of the Khyber Pakhtunkhwa, Pakistan.

Construction was started in 2008 and completed in 2011 at a cost of PKR 553 million. The dam has a height of 30.7 m (101 ft), covered a length of around 537 m (1,762 ft), with water storage capacity of 3,585,726 m^{3} (2,907 acre⋅ft).

== See also ==
- List of dams and reservoirs in Pakistan
