= Pelar Dam =

Dam in Balochistan, Pakistan

- Country: Pakistan
- Location: Awaran District, Balochistan
- Status: Proposed
- Construction began: 2013
- Opening date: 2016
- Construction cost: PKR 9.557 Billion
- Owner: Government of Balochistan

Dam and spillways
- Type of dam: Concrete Gravity Dam
- Height: 60 ft (18 m)

Reservoir
- Total capacity: 99,175 AF

Power Station
- Installed capacity: 300 KW

Pelar Dam is a proposed dam located across Nal River in Awaran District of Balochistan, Pakistan.

The proposed dam was a 18-metre (60 ft) high concrete gravity dam with a gross storage capacity of 122,331,000 cubic metres (99,175 acre⋅ft) to irrigate an area of 103.8 square kilometres (25,650 acres). Due to financial constraints, funding for the project was stopped in 2011.

== See also ==
- List of dams and reservoirs in Pakistan
