= Garuk Dam =

Dam in Kharan, Balochistan, Pakistan

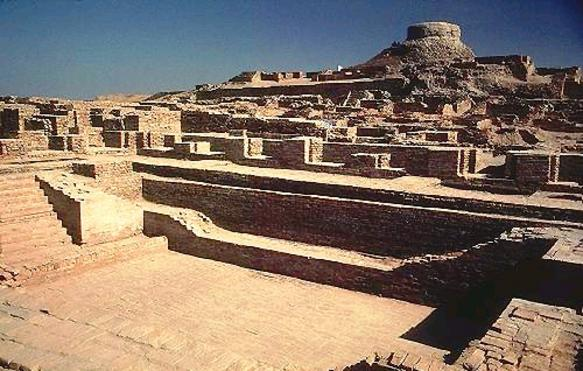
- Country: Pakistan
- Location: Kharan District, Balochistan
- Status: Proposed
- Construction began: 2013 (proposed)
- Opening date: 2016
- Construction cost: PKR 7.921 Billion
- Owner: Government of Balochistan

Dam and spillways
- Type of dam: Earth Core Rockfill Dam
- Height: 184 ft (56 m)

Reservoir
- Total capacity: 50,695 AF

Power Station
- Installed capacity: 300 KW

Garuk Dam is a proposed dam located on Garuk River, 47 km south east of Kharan District in Balochistan, Pakistan. The dam is an earth core rockfilled dam with a height of 56 m (184 ft). The reservoir when completed will irrigate a command area of 5,059 ha (12,500 acres) and will have hydro-power capacity of 300 KW.

== See also ==
- List of dams and reservoirs in Pakistan
- List of power stations in Pakistan
