= Nai River =

River in Shandong, China

Nai River (Chinese: 奈河; pinyin: Nài Hé) or River Null is a river in Tai'an, Shandong Province, China. It merges into Dawen River, then empties into Dongping Lake. The river flows through the city of Taian.

== See also ==
- List of rivers in China
