= Dhalla =

Dhalla ڈھـلہ
- Town
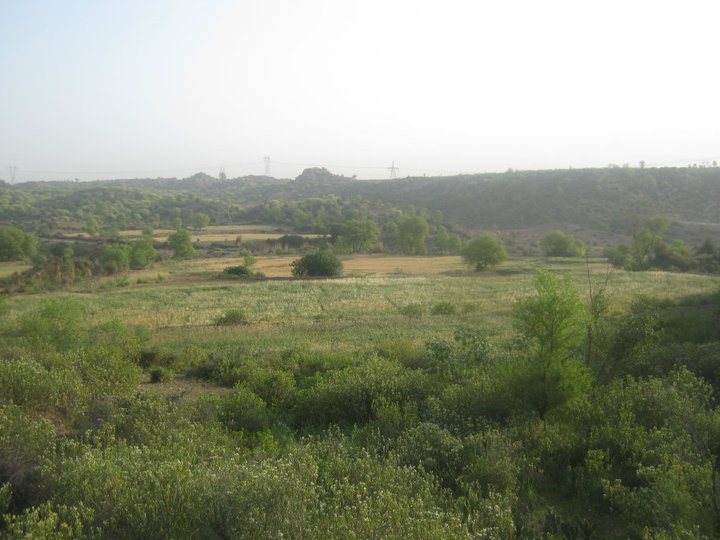
- Dhalla View from Thapla
- Interactive map of Dhalla
- Coordinates: 32.0333°N 73.9667°E
- Country: Pakistan
- Province: Punjab (Pakistan)
- District: Rawalpindi
- Tehsil: Rawalpindi Tehsil
- Union council: Adiala

Government
  - Type: Union Council

Area
  - Total: 1.00 km^{2} (0.39 sq mi)
- Elevation: 434 m (1,424 ft)

Population (2011)
  - Total: 2,700
- Time zone: UTC+5 (PST)
- Postal Code: 47311
- Calling code: 051

Dhalla (Urdu: ڈھـلہ) is a small town of Rawalpindi District in the Punjab province of Pakistan. It has 260 houses. It is located in Northern Punjab at 33°25'36N 72°57'25E with an altitude of 434 metres (1423 ft) and lies south of the district capital, Rawalpindi. The latest consolidation operation was held in 1986. Descendants of those that held leadership positions during the Sikh Empire and British Raj continue to use the awarded Dhalla title and some families have even adopted Dhalla as a surname.

== History ==
1: Village "Dhalla" located on Adiala Chontra Road in the southwest direction "near Swan River", about 25 km from Rawalpindi Saddar, is one of the ancient villages of the Potohar region. This village is located on the centuries-old pass/highway that used to go from Mera Kalan ~ Dhalla via Margalla Taxila to Chak Beli Khan and other areas. In ancient times, invaders from Afghanistan and Central Asia or others have been using this ancient route. During this time the village of "Dhalla" on the banks of the river Swan has been an important stop for these "caravans". 2: About seven hundred years ago in the fourteenth century AD, "Raja Daulat Khan" a.k.a. Raja Dhol Khan settled "Dhala" and declared it as his Rajdhani (capital). 3: Founder Dhola Raja Dhol Khan's grandfather's name was "Raja Pakhardev". This Raja Pakhardeva was the grandson of "Raja Pragu, ruler of Jammu". His descendants are called "Pakhdal Rajput". During this period Baran Shah Addara Chauhan was the ruler in the "Potohar region" whose capital was centered at the present "Mohalla Addara" near CMH and Tench Bhatta Rawalpindi. When this Chauhan ruler revolted in his kingdom, he sought help from the rulers of the "Jamwal Minhas tribe of Jammu"; So Raja Pakhardev was sent with an army to help him, who came and crushed the rebellion. At which the ruler of Pothohar was pleased and gave Pakhardev not only his daughter's relationship but Gujarkhan, apart from the present Chakwal and some areas of Jhelum; Contraila; color bottom; support; The property of Chontra and Adiala was given as Jagir. Chakwal by Raja Pakhardev; He made his capital at "Dheri Jandala" at the confluence of Jhelum and Rawalpindi - Raja Pakhardev also died at this place. 4: Later two great-grandsons of Raja Pakhardev, Fateh Dev and Baj Dev "converted to Islam". Their Islamic names were given as Fateh Khan and Allah Khan respectively. four sons of Raja Baj Dev (Allah Khan) "Raja Daulat Khan alias Dhol Khan" (Bani Dhalla); Raja Qamar a.k.a. Kol Khan (Founder Kontrala); Raja Jasamat alias Jasi Khan (founder of Sahala) and Raja Basat Khan alias Basi Khan (founder of Pakhadal) and after the death of their father, they divided the property into four different parts- 5: "Raja Daulat Khan a.k.a. Dhol Khan" inherits present blanket from father's side; Chantra; Terahiya; The throne fell; rattle; Suhawah; learn Sahang and Raman areas were acquired, so he settled the village of Dhala on the banks of the river Swan and declared it as his capital. This capital was established under the leadership of Raja Dhol Khan at the time of the invasion of India by the "renowned conqueror Amir Timur Ling in 1398 A.D." 6: When "Zahiruddin Babur", the founder of the Mughal ruling family in India, attacked "Bhera" in 1519, he crossed the Margalla and turned to the southeast and "Minhas Pakhdal" on the banks of the Swan in this capital of the Rajputs. Stayed after which he went towards Kallar Kahar. This capital has also been mentioned by Babur Badshah in his famous book "Tazak Babri". Babur King came here for the second time and both times the capital of Dhalla was ruled by "Raja Jassi Khan". 7: After that, the famous Mughal king of India "Jahangir" also came to Dhalla and in this period "Raja Malik Khan" was the mansabdar of Dhalla. In February 1660, Jahangir Badshah celebrated his 53rd birthday/jeshan talawan (diamond jewels) in "Tahsil Hasan Abdal" in Attock district and invited the nearby officials and dignitaries to visit Hasan Abdal. Where every mansabdar showed different essences of bravery. On this occasion, "Raja Malik Khan", the mansabdar of the Dhalla capital, showed such excellent archery that King Jahangir gave him the title of Tirahi (master archer). He then accordingly settled the village of "Terahia" which is situated a few kilometers south of Gorakhpur (near Adiala Jail) across the river Swan. 8: Descendants of Raja Dhol Khan, the founder of Dhalla, raised a rebellion in Punjab "against the atrocities of the Sikhs" in the late eighteenth century and early nineteenth century and did not allow them to set foot in their territory. "Raja Gauhar Khan" and "Raja Madad Khan" among the descendants of Mansab Dar Dhalla Raja Malik Khan Tirahi fought a guerilla war against the Sikhs. The Sikh ruler of Punjab "Ranjit Singh" also built a military cantonment at Banda in accordance with Birgi Singh, but the people of "Dhalla and Tirahia" could not be subjugated. When Raja Gohar Ali Khan was injured during the resistance and went to Ranjit Singh's prison, he was martyred in 1823 while being imprisoned. Raja Gauhar Ali Khan and Raja Madad Ali Khan were greatly influenced by the Jihad movement of "Syed Ahmad Shaheed" and "Shah Ismail Shaheed" against the Sikh Government of Punjab and practically supported this movement. (Note: It is most likely that the few graves in Dhalla Village Baba Shaheed's graves belong to the same martyrs who died in rebellion against the Sikh atrocities almost two and a half centuries ago; but the correct information in this context (More research is needed.) 9: In 1849, when the Sikh rule came to an end throughout the Punjab and the British took complete control of the Punjab, at the beginning of this period, "Dhala"; Terahiya; Malana; Suhawah; on them; The people of Chhapar maintained a rebellious attitude, but then, like other parts of India, the British government, acting with great prudence, gave honorary positions to a few personalities; By giving jagirs and powers, they split among themselves, which gradually died down this resistance. 10: Like other capitals of India, "This Rajdhani of Dhalla" also went through the process of division by division over time. Chapar; on them; Terahiya; Suhawah; The throne fell; anchor; learn Sahang; Rama; Sangral and many other small villages were divided. It may be recalled that the Rajgan of Dhala had a "regular post of datka" who compiled genealogical records of all the "Pakhdal Minhas Rajputs" of that capital.

== Location and geography ==
Dhalla is located on a hill on Adiala Road. It is 31.7 km (19.7 mi) away from the Islamabad International Airport and 19 km (12 mi) from Rawalpindi.

== Surrounding ==
Dhalla has 2 dams in its surrounding areas, Jawa Dam and Khasala Dam in the village before Dhalla. The river Sawan is passing in front of the village. The bed of Sawan river is very fertile and full of greenery which have an outstanding look from the top of the village. The temperature in winter may decrease to 1 c and in June may rise up to 55 c. Mostly people are farmers and make their income from farming but the new generation know is moving towards industrial and government departments.

== Education ==
There are a number of government educational institutions being developed in the town, such as

- Govt. High School Dhalla for boys.
- Govt. Primary School Dhalla for boys.
- Govt. Girls High School Dhalla for girls.

Students from nearby villages come and study in these schools. Some private English Medium schools are also there in the town.

== Health ==
There is a government hospital in the town with several beds spaces. It is an old hospital before the independence. Its building structure was old style recently new building constructed on the same place. One family welfare center is available and one private clinic is also in the town, people from nearby villages come and get treatment and medicine for small diseases and injuries from the hospital and clinic.

== Telecommunication ==
The PTCL provides the main network of landline telephone. Many ISPs and all major mobile phone and wireless companies operating in Pakistan provide service in Dhalla.

== Religion ==
There are five mosques in the town Jamia Mosque, Farooq'e Azam Mosque and Bilal Mosque. One under construction Madrasa Hanfia Farooqia is also in the town for Islamic education and memorizing the Quran. There is an accommodation for student of Madrasa. This runs with the help of locals and charities. Approximately 99% population of the town is Sunni Muslims.

== Agriculture ==
Dhalla is an agricultural town in this area. People harvest the vegetables and Approximately 80% population is attached with this field. A significant proportion of the population belong to the Minhas rajpoot (Pakhraal), Awan and khengar tribe and their lives and source of income totally depend on their agricultural land of the Sawan river bed which consist of very fertile soil of Sawan river. The people of Dhalla also use the water of jawa dam for cultivation

== Water reservoir ==
Jawa Dam is a small water reservoir. It located in the Dhungi Reserved Forest. This dam was designed to irrigate 800 acres of land with irrigation requirement of 0.783 MCM at cropping intensity of 100%. Jawa dam became operational in 1997. Since its inception, the dam received almost constant inflow till 2000. However, after 2000, the inflow decreased gradually most probably due to decrease in rainfall. Except for the year 1998 and 2002, the outflow has been less than the inflow. Because this dam is built on a perennial stream, it received regular and constant flow throughout the year. However, the flow is relatively high in June to August, due to monsoon. The total average annual inflow to dam is 0.687 MCM, whereas, outflow is 0.777 MCM. In this case the discharge is more than the inflow. However, the available irrigation supply from the dam is almost equal the designed irrigation requirement of 0.783 MCM. Therefore, in general, the available water is sufficient to irrigate the designed area. But unfortunately the dam serves very less to the land of Dhalla although the dam is situated in the land of Dhalla.
