= Shahpur Dam =

- Interactive map of Shahpur Dam
- Country: Pakistan
- Location: Attock District, Punjab
- Coordinates: 33°37′N 72°41′E
- Status: In use
- Opening date: 1986
- Construction cost: PKR 36.5 million
- Owners: Small Dams Organization, Government of Punjab

Dam and spillways
- Type of dam: Concrete Gravity
- Height: 26 m (85 ft)
- Length: 93.26 m (306 ft)

Reservoir
- Total capacity: 17,620,000 m^{3} (14,285 acre⋅ft)

Shahpur Dam is located in Attock District on Nandana River in Punjab, Pakistan. The dam is 26 m (85 ft) high and has a storage capacity of 17,620,000 m^{3} (14,285 acre⋅ft). With the recent development in the surroundings, the dam has now become a popular picnic spot for locals as well as for the people of nearby cities.

== Location ==
The dam site is located in Fateh Jang Tehsil near Kala Chitta Range in Attock District, at around 45 km (28 mi) away from Islamabad and 8 km (5 mi) North of Fateh Jang. The dam was commissioned by Small Dams Organization, Government of Punjab in 1982 and was completed in 1986 at a cost of PKR 36.5 million.

== See also ==
- List of dams and reservoirs in Pakistan
