= Bunji Dam =

Upcoming dam in Gilgit-Baltistan, Pakistan

- Location within Pakistan
- Official name: Bunji Hydro-power Project
- Country: Pakistan
- Location: Bunji, Gilgit Baltistan
- Coordinates: 35°43′8″N 74°44′26″E
- Status: Design stage
- Construction cost: $8.1 billion
- Owner: Water And Power Development Authority (WAPDA)

Dam and spillways
- Type of dam: Gravity RCC
- Impounds: Indus River
- Height: 190 metres (620 ft)
- Spillway capacity: 1900 m^{3}/s

Reservoir
- Creates: Indus River

Power Station
- Hydraulic head: 428 metres (1,404 ft)
- Turbines: 20 Francis type
- Installed capacity: 7100 MW
- Annual generation: 24088 GWh

Bunji Dam is proposed large hydro-power project on Indus River in Bunji, Gilgit Baltistan, Pakistan. If built it would be Pakistan's second largest hydropower project.

The feasibility study of the project was carried out by joint consultant firms Artelia and Sogreah Consultants of France, Nippon Koei of Japan and Development, Mott MacDonald of UK and Management consultants, MM Pakistan (Pvt.) Ltd. (MMP), and DMC of Pakistan. The Gravity RCC dam will be 190 m high and will have an installed capacity of 7100 MW. In 2009, Pakistan and China signed an MoU for the construction of Bunji Dam. The accord was signed between Ministry of Water and Power, Pakistan and Three Gorges Project Corporation, China. The construction cost of the dam is US$8.1 billion.

== Project description ==
The project is located on Indus River near Gilgit. The power house and dam sites are 560 km & 610 km, respectively, from Islamabad.

Water and Power Development Authority (WAPDA) completed the pre-feasibility report in March 2005. Consultancy agreement has been extended till September 2012. The final report was expected to be finalized and issue till September 30, 2012. Ministry of Water and Power intended to implement the project through PPIB. Bunji Consultants JV is to complete the Design Report, preparation of Tender Documents and PC-I considering the completed and ongoing investigation up to September 30, 2012. Transmission Scheme for Dispersal of Power from Bunji Hydropower Project to Major Load Centers in the National Grid. The estimated cost is US$8.1 billion.

== Design ==
In May 2013, Water and Power Development Authority (WAPDA) completed the engineering design and tendered documents of the 7,100 megawatt (MW) Bunji Hydropower Project.

== See also ==
- List of dams and reservoirs in Pakistan
