= Khisar Dam =

Upcoming dam in Nushki, Balochistan, Pakistan

Coordinates: 29°58′17″N 66°04′53″E

- Interactive map of Khisar Dam
- Country: Pakistan
- Location: Nushki District, Balochistan
- Purpose: Power
- Status: Under-construction

Khisar Dam is an under-construction dam, located in Nushki District, Balochistan, Pakistan.
