= Bara Dam =

Dam in Khyber Pakhtunkhwa, Pakistan

- Location within Pakistan
- Country: Pakistan
- Location: Tirah Valley, Khyber Agency, FATA
- Coordinates: 33°58′N 71°01′E
- Purpose: Irrigation, power
- Status: Proposed
- Construction cost: $311 million
- Owner: WAPDA

Dam and spillways
- Type of dam: Earth core rockfill
- Impounds: Bara River
- Height: 92 m (302 ft)
- Length: 450 m (1,477 ft)

Reservoir
- Total capacity: 105 million m^{3}

Power Station
- Operator: WAPDA
- Installed capacity: 5.8 MW
- Annual generation: 11 GWh

Bara Dam is a proposed small, low-head, earth core rockfill, hydroelectric dam with a capacity of 5.8 megawatts, located across Bara River at the confluence of Mastura River in Tirah Valley, Khyber District, Peshawar Division, Pakistan. It is part of a wider plan that consists in remodeling the Bara River, to promote agriculture.

Construction, which had not started yet as of late 2019, is expected to last 5 years.

The estimated cost of the project is US$311 million (Rs. 14.2 billion), out of which $227 million for civil works and $28 million for electro-mechanical works are required.

== Main uses ==
With the construction of the proposed Bara Dam, flood waters of Bara River will be stored. Gross storage of the reservoir is 105 million cubic metres (85,363 acre⋅ft) of which an average of about 110 million cubic metres (89,000 acre⋅ft) of water will be annually available for developing irrigated agriculture of command area of about 17,000 hectares (42,000 acres). This project will produce 5.8 MW of power with an annual energy output of 36 TJ (10 GW⋅h).

== Other benefits ==
Damming the flow of Bara River will save the flood water for irrigated agriculture development, power generation and water supply for drinking and other domestic uses. The project will bring general uplift of the people in the area by creation of employment and business opportunities. These indirect benefits, such as employment opportunities and consequent rise in the living standard of the people, however cannot be quantified in monetary term. The direct receipt of the project will be available in shape of irrigation service fee (Abiana) and receipt of cost of sale of energy to consumers. The project would greatly increase the development of fisheries in the area and provide recreation and employment opportunities to the residents of the area.

== Current status ==
- Feasibility Study completed in 2008.
- PC-I approved by ECNEC on 3 September 2009.
- Tenders of Bara Dam on EPC basis invited on 9 October, 5 November, 19 December 2009, 8 April 2010. No bid received.
- WAPDA appointed consultants for preparation of Project Planning Report and Tender Documents based on Detailed Engineering Design to invite Tenders on measurement (BOQ) basis.
- Detailed Engineering Design of the Project completed in December, 2011.
- Detailed Level EIA and RAP Studies are in Progress.
- Tenders for construction will be invited on finalization of Project Planning Report and Tender Documents and on availability of funds for the Project.
- In 2019, government proposed to allocate Rs 230 million to initiate the project by 2020.

== See also ==
- List of dams and reservoirs in Pakistan
- List of power stations in Pakistan
