= Dotara Dam =

Dam in Khyber Pakhtunkhwa, Pakistan

- Official name: بند دوتارہ
- Country: Pakistan
- Location: Dotara village, Abbottabad District, Khyber Pakhtunkhwa
- Purpose: Power
- Status: Proposed
- Construction cost: Rs. 236.250 Million
- Operator: WAPDA

Dam and spillways
- Type of dam: Carryover
- Impounds: Haro River
- Height (foundation): 121 m

Reservoir
- Total capacity: 49,900,000 m3

Dotara Dam is a proposed carryover dam located in Dotara village, Abbottabad District, Khyber Pakhtunkhwa, Pakistan. It will supply water to Rawalpindi and Islamabad, serve as a facility for fisheries, and reduce silting in the downstream Khanpur Dam, extending its lifespan to over 100 years.
