= Jawa Dam (Pakistan) =

Dam in Punjab, Pakistan

- Location: Dhalla in Rawalpindi District, Punjab, Pakistan
- Status: In use
- Opening date: 1994
- Construction cost: PKR20.13 million

Dam and spillways
- Type of dam: Zoned Earth and Rock-filled
- Impounds: Jawa Stream
- Height: 25 m (82 ft)
- Length: 143 m (469 ft)
- Width (crest): 109.75 m (360 ft)
- Spillway type: Service
- Spillway capacity: 41 m^{3}/s (1,448 cu ft/s)

Reservoir
- Total capacity: 1,938,000 m^{3} (1,571 acre⋅ft)
- Active capacity: 1,110,000 m^{3} (900 acre⋅ft)
- Catchment area: 9.35 km^{2} (2,310 acres)
- Surface area: 30.76 ha (0 km^{2})

Jawa Dam is a dam located in Rawalpindi District on Jawa River in Punjab, Pakistan. The dam is 25 m (82 ft) high and has a gross reservoir capacity of 1,938,000 m^{3} (1,571 acre⋅ft).

The dam was completed in 1994 at a cost of PKR 20.13 million and has an estimated life span of 65 years. The reservoir has a gross command area of 323.88 km^{2} (80,032 acres).

== See also ==
List of dams and reservoirs in Pakistan
