= Murunj Dam =

- Country: Pakistan
- Location: Rajanpur District, Punjab
- Purpose: Power
- Status: Proposed
- Construction cost: Rs. 254.236 million
- Operator: WAPDA

Dam and spillways
- Type of dam: Earth fill and Rock-fill dam
- Impounds: Kaha Nullah
- Height (foundation): 32 m

Reservoir
- Active capacity: 0.45 MAF

Power Station
- Installed capacity: 6 MW

Murunj Dam (مرنج ڈیم) is a proposed dam located in Rajanpur District, Punjab, Pakistan. The Project is proposed to be built across Kaha Nullah at about 116 km West of Rajanpur District. Nearest village is Marri, which is about 15 km from dam site. The commencement date is June 2020 and expected completion date is June 2023. The available water resources are very scarce in Rajanpur and adjoining areas facing acute shortage of fresh water for drinking and agriculture. The annual monsoon rains give rise to flashy hill torrents causing inundation of thousands of acres land in the adjoining foothills and rendering damages to public property and cultivated land each year.

The exact location of the dam has not been decided.
