= Balakot Hydropower Project =

- Country: Pakistan
- Location: Kunhar River, Khyber Pakhtunkhwa
- Status: under construction
- Construction began: September 2022
- Construction cost: USD 550 million
- Owner: Government of Khyber Pakhtunkhwa
- Operators: Pakhtunkhwa Energy Development Organisation, Government of Khyber Pakhtunkhwa

Power generation
- Units operational: 3
- Make and model: Francis turbines
- Nameplate capacity: 300 MW
- Annual net output: 1,143 GWh

The Balakot Hydropower Project is designed as a run-of-river scheme and is slated to be built on the Kunhar River. Its primary objective is to generate clean energy and alleviate the demand-supply disparity in Khyber Pakhtunkhwa and nearby areas. The project is anticipated to yield a power generation capacity of 300 MW, contributing to a significant average annual energy production of 1143 GWh.

The Balakot Hydropower Project is a joint venture financially supported by both the Asian Development Bank and the Asian Infrastructure Investment Bank. The overall funding for this venture amounts to US$550 million, with the Asian Development Bank providing US$300 million, and the Asian Infrastructure Investment Bank contributing US$250 million.

== Construction ==
The Balakot Hydropower Project encompasses various key components, foremost being the construction of a 58-meter-high gravity concrete dam along with associated appurtenant structures. The project also involves river diversion works, a sediment bypass tunnel, and a comprehensive power circuit. The power circuit infrastructure comprises a power intake, a concrete-lined headrace tunnel, an upstream surge shaft, steel-lined pressure shafts and penstocks, a downstream surge shaft, and a concrete-lined tailrace tunnel. Additionally, the project includes a cavern-type powerhouse that accommodates three Francis turbines, collectively offering an installed capacity of 300 MW. This powerhouse is equipped with access tunnels and an exterior switchyard for efficient functioning.
