= Khokher Zer Dam =

Khokher Zer_Dam
- Location: Khokher Zer in Chakwal District, Punjab, Pakistan
- Status: In use
- Construction cost: PKR20.13 million

Dam and spillways
- Type of dam: Zoned Earth and Rock-filled
- Impounds: Khokher Zer Stream
- Spillway type: Service

Reservoir
- Total capacity: 1,938,000 m^{3} (1,571 acre⋅ft)
- Active capacity: 1,110,000 m^{3} (900 acre⋅ft)
- Catchment area: 9.35 km^{2} (2,310 acres)
- Surface area: 30.76 ha (0 km^{2})

The Khokhar Zer dam lies in the south of Chakwal subdivision in Pakistan. Its capacity is 2602 A.Ft and it irrigates 1200 acres. Water supplied to Chakwal city also comes from this dam.
