= Hingol Dam =

Dam in Balochistan, Pakistan

- Location within Pakistan
- Official name: Hingol Dam
- Location: Lasbela District, Balochistan, Pakistan
- Coordinates: 25°22′48″N 62°51′51″E
- Status: constructed
- Owners: Water and Power Development Authority (WAPDA), Government of Balochistan

Dam and spillways
- Impounds: Hingol River
- Height: 172 ft (52 m)
- Length: 2,500 ft (760 m)

Power Station
- Operator: WAPDA
- Type: Central Core Zone
- Installed capacity: 3.5 MW
- Annual generation: 4.4 GWh

Hingol Dam is a proposed small, low-head, Central Core Zone, hydroelectric power generation dam of 3.5 megawatt (MW) generation capacity, located in the Lasbela District across the Hingol River in the Balochistan province of Pakistan. It is located at a distance of 260 km (162 mi) northwest of Karachi and about 16 km (10 mi) north of bridge across the Hingol River on the Makran Coastal Highway and about 8 km (5 mi) north of Kund Malir where the river falls into the sea.

== Main Uses ==
With the construction of the proposed Hingol Dam, flood waters of Hingol River will be stored. Gross storage of the reservoir is 2.10 MAF of which an average of about 1.3 MAF water will be annually available for developing irrigated agriculture of the command area of 32,375 ha (80,000 acres). This project will produce 3.5 MW of power generation with annual energy of 4.4 GWh.

== Other Benefits ==
Damming the flow of Hingol River will save the flood water for irrigated agriculture development, power generation and water supply for drinking and other domestic uses. The project is poised to uplift the local community of the area by consequently rising the living standard of the people and generating novel employment and business opportunities. Such indirect benefits, however, cannot be quantified in monetary term. The direct receipt of the project will be available in shape of irrigation service fee (Abiana) and receipt of cost of sale of energy to consumers. The project would greatly increase the development of fisheries in the area and provide recreation and employment opportunities to the residents of the area. The estimated cost of the project will be worth US$311 Million. Out of which US$227 Million for civil works and US$28 Million for electro-mechanical works are required.

== History ==
Feasibility studies for the dam were completed in 1992. However, due to various reasons including financial constraints and local opposition, the dam is still not constructed. In 2008, members of the Balochistan Assembly opposed the construction of the dam. The local Hindu community protested the construction of the dam as it will damage the historic Hindu temple Hinglaj Mata and would destroy the eco-system of the nearby situated Hingol National Park.

The proposed was shifted 16 km (10 mi) upstream to the original site to facilitate the demands to protect the temple, however since then due to financial constraints progress on construction of the dam is slow.

== Salient Features ==
Type of Dam: Central Core Zoned Dam
Maximum height of Dam: 52 m (172 ft)
Length of dam: 760 m (2,500 ft)
Gross storage capacity: 1.3 MAF
Installed capacity: 3.5 MW
Command Area: 32,375 ha (80,000 acres)

Cropped area: 64,750 ha (160,000 acres)
Cropping Intensity: 200%
EIRR: 16.37%
B.C. Ratio: 1.45:1

== Current status ==
- PC-I Proforma (New Site) cleared by CDWP in its meeting held on November 19, 2009, and

cleared for approval of ECNEC.

- Detailed Engineering Design and Tender Documents of the New Site is in progress Studies of the p

Project (New Site) in progress, was to be completed by January 2011.

- Construction bids were invited on July 11, 2011.

== See also ==
- List of dams and reservoirs in Pakistan
- List of power stations in Pakistan
- Khan Khwar Hydropower Project
- Satpara Dam
- Gomal Zam Dam
- Duber Khwar hydropower project
