= Sarki Lawaghar Dam =

Dam in Khyber Pakhtunkhwa, Pakistan

Sarki Lawaghar Dam is a dam in Union Council SarKi lawaghar Of Tehsil Taht-e-Nusrati. (Karak, Khyber Pakhtunkhwa), Pakistan.

A rest house has also been constructed on the hill top. The dam's reservoir has become a tourist attraction for picnics, nature lovers and youngsters in District Karak. According to a Ranraa TV program aired dated on May 25, 2016, the majority of the picnickers interviewed wanted construction of a road to the dam.

On August 13, 2016 following heavy monsoon rains, the drainage system of the dam gave way.
