= Dasu Dam =

Dam in Pakistan

- Location within Pakistan
- Interactive map of Dasu Dam
- Country: Pakistan
- Location: Dasu, Kohistan District, Khyber Pakhtunkhwa Province
- Coordinates: 35°19′02.16″N 73°11′35.78″E
- Purpose: Power, water supply
- Status: Under construction
- Construction began: January 2020
- Opening date: Dec 2027 (est.)
- Construction cost: $6.2 billion (stage I)
- Owner: Government of Pakistan
- Operator: Water and Power Development Authority (WAPDA)

Dam and spillways
- Type of dam: Gravity, roller-compacted concrete
- Impounds: Indus River
- Height: 242 m (794 ft)
- Length: 570 m (1,870 ft)

Reservoir
- Total capacity: 1,410,000,000 m^{3} (1,140,000 acre⋅ft)

Dasu Hydropower Plant
- Coordinates: 35°17′47.03″N 73°12′44.59″E
- Commission date: 2027 (stage I)
- Hydraulic head: 171.59 m (563.0 ft)
- Turbines: Stage I: 6 x 360 MW Francis-type; Stage II: 6 x 360 MW Francis-type
- Installed capacity: 4,320 MW
- Annual generation: 21 TWh

The Dasu Dam is a large (largest run of the river dam in world) hydroelectric gravity dam currently under construction on the Indus River near Dasu in Kohistan District, Khyber Pakhtunkhwa Province, Pakistan. It is developed by Pakistan Water and Power Development Authority (Wapda), as a key component of the company's Water Vision 2025. The project was started in 2017 but faced a delay due to funds and land acquisition disputes. Work resumed in 2020 after land acquisition and arrangements of funding facility, the World Bank agreed to contribute $700 million of the $4.2 billion as the pakistan government decided to proceed ahead with the construction of the project, as part of the WAPDAs vision 2025.

The 242 m (794 ft) tall dam will support a 4,320 MW hydropower station, to be built in two 2,160 MW stages. The plant is expected to start generating power in 2029, and stage-I is planned to complete by 2029.

Water from the reservoir will be diverted to the power station located about 3.5 km (2.2 mi) downstream.

== Timeline ==
Dasu dam proposal was approved in 2001, as part of Government of Pakistan's Vision 2025 program. Feasibility study was completed in 2009.

The first stage was approved by the executive committee of the National Economic Council on 29 March 2014. It will cost an estimated $4.278 billion. Former Prime Minister Nawaz Sharif attended the dam's groundbreaking ceremony on 25 June 2014.

Contracts for preparatory works of the project were awarded in the first half of 2015, and early construction works actually started in June 2017.

The main civil works, undertaken by China Gezhouba Group Company Limited, started in February 2018. Work on the water diversion tunnel was inaugurated December 2018.

In November 2019, WAPDA signed a Rs52.5 billion contract with a Chinese joint-venture, regarding electro-mechanical works. This contract includes design, supply and installation of the first stage's six 360 MW turbines, along with their generators, and transformers.

As of December 2020, construction activities on the Main Civil Works (02 diversion tunnels, underground powerhouse, access tunnels), Right Bank Access Road, the relocation of Karakoram Highway, Project Colony, 132 kV transmission line, and Resettlement Sites for affected people are underway.

== Funding ==
The project cost was revised from an initial Rs486.093 billion to Rs510.980 billion, mainly because of escalation of land cost.

Project is being financed by the World Bank (US$588 million), the local commercial financing from a consortium of local banks (Rs144 billion), and foreign commercial financing from Credit Suisse Bank ($350 million). WAPDA will also inject its equity equivalent to 15% of the project base cost.

On 1 April 2020, the World Bank approved an additional US$700 million in financing, with the funds to be used for the 765 kV transmission line that will complete the first 2,160 MW phase of the project on the Indus River.

In June 2024, US$1 billion in additional financing for the Dasu Hydropower Project was approved by the World Bank.

== See also ==
Diamer-Bhasha Dam

Tarbela Dam
