= Chiniot Dam =

Proposed dam in Punjab, Pakistan

- Country: Pakistan
- Location: Chiniot District, Punjab
- Purpose: Power
- Status: Proposed
- Construction cost: Rs. 533.303 million
- Operator: WAPDA

Dam and spillways
- Type of dam: Earth fill and Rock-fill dam
- Impounds: Chenab River
- Height (foundation): 60 ft

Power Station
- Installed capacity: 80 MW

Chiniot Dam is a proposed dam to be built on Chenab river. It is located in Chiniot District, Punjab, Pakistan. The dam is intended to store excess flows from the Chenab River to meet downstream irrigation water needs and generate electricity for the national grid. The dam is 17 meters high and is a zoned earthfill embankment. This dam will also help to improve the domestic water supply to the nearby towns and villages.
