= Zhob =

Zhob ږوب
- City
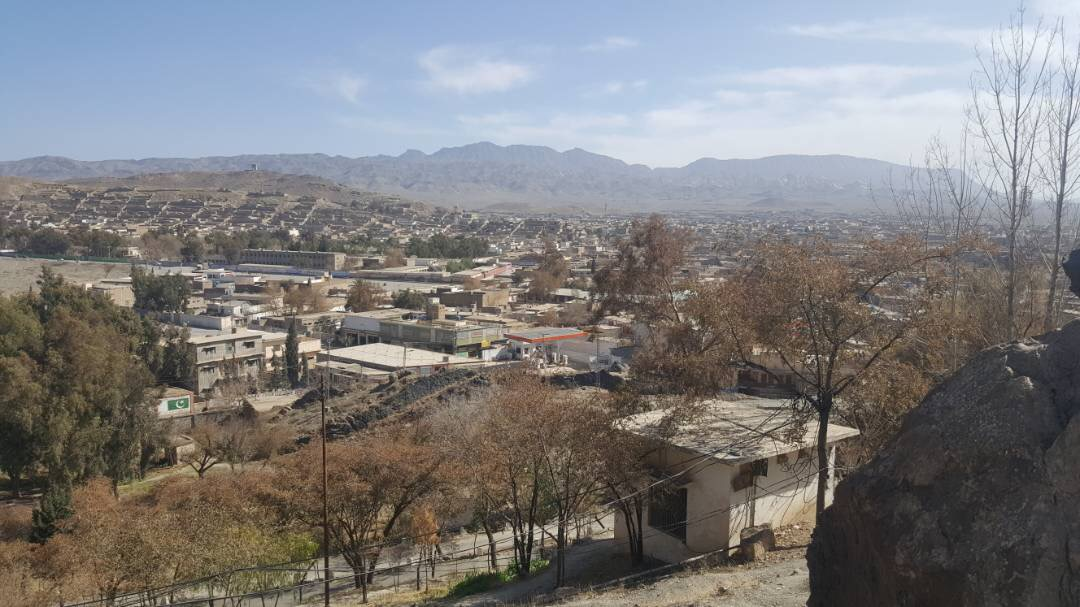
- A view of the city

- Location within Balochistan, Pakistan Location within Pakistan
- Coordinates: 31°20′30″N 69°26′55″E
- Country: Pakistan
- Province: (Balochistan, Pakistan) Balochistan
- District: Zhob

Area
  - Metro: 20,297 km^{2} (7,837 sq mi)
- Elevation: 1,426 m (4,678 ft)

Population (2023)
  - City: 46,976
- Demonym: Zhobi
- Time zone: UTC+5 (PST)
- Postal code: 85200
- Calling code: 822
- Highways: N-50

Zhob (English: /ʒoʊb/; Pashto: ږوب, romanized: Ẓ̌ob, lit. 'oozing water'), formerly known as Fort Sandeman, is a city and district headquarters of the Zhob District in the Balochistan province of Pakistan. Zhob is located on the banks of the Zhob river. It lies 337 kilometres away from Quetta, the capital of Balochistan.

During the British colonial era, it was named Fort Sandeman after the British Indian Army officer Robert Groves Sandeman. It obtained its current name in 1976 when the then prime minister of Pakistan Zulfikar Ali Bhutto changed its name.

== Tourism Spots ==
1. Darga Mandezai: Kali Darga Mandezai is a vibrant village in Zhob, Balochistan, nestled near the flowing Zhob River. Home to the Mandezai tribe, it blends tradition with youthful energy. Locals take pride in their hospitality, spiritual heritage, and rising interest in education. The village also boasts open cricket grounds and playfields, where young talent comes alive under the wide Balochistan sky — making it a lively hub of culture, sport, and community spirit.
2. Silyaza: One of the most visited picnic spots of the Zhob district, Pakistan. The stream is surrounded by the orchards of apples, grapes, and extensive fields of maize and wheat. Pashtoon tribes living here are Mandokhail.
3. Paryan-o-Ghundi: Visiting places in this area are Oboo Shakh, Tarjana Narai, Shaly Narai, Uzgii Ghbarga, Sur Ghundai. This area is also rich with Zaitoon (Olive) forests.

== History ==
Early in the 13th century the country came within the sphere of the Mongol raids organised by Genghis Khan.

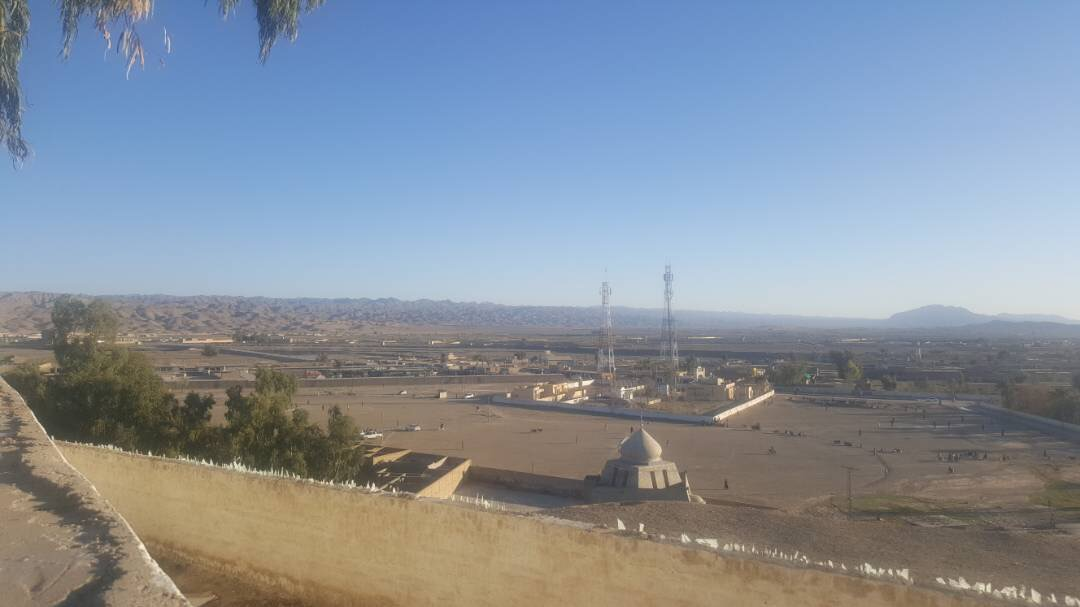
View of Zhob

Until the Zhob Valley Expedition of 1884, the area was practically unknown to Europeans. In 1889, the Zhob Valley and Gomal Pass were taken under the control of the British Government. In December 1889, the town of Zhob, then known as Apozai, was occupied by the British and named Fort Sandeman after Sir Robert Sandeman.

The military garrison included a native cavalry and a native infantry regiment. It also served as the headquarters of the Zhob Levy Corps. In 1894, a water supply from the Saliaza valley was established, enabling irrigation for corps and fruit trees planting of fruits and trees as well as providing drinking water. The project cost slightly over a lakh of rupees.

During the colonial era, the political agent resided in a building known as "the Castle" that lay to the north of the town and 150 feet (46 m) above the surface of the plain. The military lines, bazaar, dispensaries, and schools lay below. During this time, the railway system was built. The nearest railway station in Baluchistan is Harnai, 168 miles (270 km) distant. Bhakkar, the railway station for Dera Ismail Khan, is 122 miles (196 km) distant.

A local fund was created in 1890. The income during 1903-4 was 18,000 rupees and the expenditure 17,000 rupees. One-third of the net receipts from octroi were paid over to the military authorities. There is a small sanitarium, about 8,500 feet (2,600 m) above sea-level, about 30 miles (48 km) away at Shinghar on the Sulaiman range, to which resort is made in the summer months.

There is a Pakistan Army cantonment in Zhob too. Semi-nomadic people from various provinces including Afghans migrated to Zhob due to the city’s climate.

== Demographics ==
=== Population ===
Historical population
Year	Pop.	±% p.a.
1951	5,932	—
1961	8,058	+3.11%
1972	17,291	+7.19%
1981	31,931	+7.05%
1998	43,843	+1.88%
2017	46,164	+0.27%
2023	46,976	+0.29%

According to the census of 2017, the total population of Zhob city was 46,164, while the population of Zhob district was 310,544. The average annual growth rate was 2.52% from 1998 to 2017.

Religious groups in Zhob City (1941 & 2017) (Note: 1941: Data for the entirety of the town of Fort Sandeman, which included Fort Sandeman Municipality and Fort Sandeman Cantonment.)
Religious group	1941		2017	
Religious group	Pop.	%	Pop.	%
Islam	5,232	55.94%	45,291	98.11%
Hinduism	2,992	31.99%	150	0.32%
Sikhism	1,004	10.73%	—N/a	—N/a
Christianity	121	1.29%	714	1.55%
Zoroastrianism	1	0.01%	—N/a	—N/a
Ahmadiyya	—N/a	—N/a	9	0.02%
Others	3	0.03%	0	0%
Total population	9,353	100%	46,164	100%

== Climate ==
Zhob has a semi-arid climate (Köppen BSh). Its rainfall is high enough to avoid the arid climate category found at lower elevations. Zhob receive rainfall on occasions from the monsoon, though this occurs very erratically.

Climate data for Zhob (1991-2020)
Month	Jan	Feb	Mar	Apr	May	Jun	Jul	Aug	Sep	Oct	Nov	Dec	Year
Record high °C (°F)	22.8 (73.0)	26.0 (78.8)	32.0 (89.6)	36.1 (97.0)	40.0 (104.0)	42.8 (109.0)	41.7 (107.1)	40.6 (105.1)	39.6 (103.3)	35.0 (95.0)	29.2 (84.6)	24.4 (75.9)	42.8 (109.0)
Mean daily maximum °C (°F)	14.1 (57.4)	16.2 (61.2)	21.6 (70.9)	27.8 (82.0)	33.4 (92.1)	36.8 (98.2)	36.7 (98.1)	35.8 (96.4)	33.6 (92.5)	28.5 (83.3)	22.5 (72.5)	17.3 (63.1)	27.0 (80.6)
Daily mean °C (°F)	6.8 (44.2)	9.4 (48.9)	14.6 (58.3)	20.6 (69.1)	25.9 (78.6)	29.5 (85.1)	29.5 (85.1)	28.6 (83.5)	26.2 (79.2)	20.4 (68.7)	13.9 (57.0)	9.7 (49.5)	19.6 (67.3)
Mean daily minimum °C (°F)	−0.6 (30.9)	2.0 (35.6)	7.5 (45.5)	13.3 (55.9)	18.5 (65.3)	22.1 (71.8)	22.7 (72.9)	22.3 (72.1)	18.8 (65.8)	12.4 (54.3)	5.7 (42.3)	0.7 (33.3)	12.1 (53.8)
Record low °C (°F)	−8.9 (16.0)	−6.7 (19.9)	−3 (27)	4.0 (39.2)	8.0 (46.4)	15.0 (59.0)	14.4 (57.9)	11.5 (52.7)	10.0 (50.0)	3.3 (37.9)	−4.4 (24.1)	−7.7 (18.1)	−8.9 (16.0)
Average precipitation mm (inches)	13.4 (0.53)	26.6 (1.05)	35.0 (1.38)	31.7 (1.25)	15.6 (0.61)	23.1 (0.91)	62.5 (2.46)	33.5 (1.32)	11.9 (0.47)	4.5 (0.18)	8.2 (0.32)	7.8 (0.31)	273.8 (10.78)
Average precipitation days (≥ 1.0 mm)	2.6	3.8	4.6	4.5	2.3	3.0	5.7	3.8	1.3	0.7	1.2	1.6	35.1
Average relative humidity (%)	40	40	41	40	29	29	45	47	40	34	32	38	38
Mean monthly sunshine hours	237.8	218.1	241.1	256.0	323.4	312.7	298.2	300.9	301.0	300.3	275.0	249.6	3,314.1
Source 1: NOAA (extremes, sun 1961–1990),
Source 2: Deutscher Wetterdienst (humidity 1959-1967)

== Transport ==
=== Roads ===
Zhob is 365 kilometres (227 mi) far from Quetta and 225 kilometres (140 mi) far from Dera Ismail Khan. However, the road linking with Dera Ismail Khan is mostly a track passing through water streams and almost all of the road is metalloid.

=== Railway ===
Zhob was linked by rail with the Pakistan Railways network. In 1986 all service stopped and in 1991, the Pakistan Railways lifted the rails and permanently removed the line. There have been proposals to replace it with a broad gauge line but nothing has been implemented. The Zhob line originally split off the Chaman line north of Quetta at Bostan. A more direct route to the capital via Dera Ismail Khan and Darya Khan was also proposed. A new project was proposed in 2021 to link Quetta with Peshawar via Bostan, Zhob, Dera Ismail Khan, Bannu and Kohat.

Nothing became of this proposal.

== See also ==
- Zhob District
- Zhob River
- Zhob Airport
- Paryan-o-Ghundi - a destroyed archaeological site near Zhob
