= Daraban Zam Dam =

Dam in Khyber Pakhtunkhwa, Pakistan

- Official name: بند دارابان زم
- Country: Pakistan
- Location: Dera Ismail Khan District, Khyber Pakhtunkhwa
- Purpose: Power
- Status: Proposed
- Construction cost: Rs. 2,751 million
- Operator: WAPDA

Dam and spillways
- Type of dam: Concrete-face rock-fill dam
- Impounds: Khora River
- Height (foundation): 46.9 m

Power Station
- Annual generation: 0.75 MW

Daraban Zam Dam is a proposed dam located in Dera Ismail Khan District, Khyber Pakhtunkhwa, Pakistan. It is proposed to be built on the Khora River.
