= Kurram Tangi Dam =

Dam in Pakistan

- Location within Pakistan
- Location: North Waziristan
- Coordinates: 33°10′14″N 70°23′59″E
- Purpose: Power, Irrigation
- Construction began: July 2016
- Opening date: Unknown
- Construction cost: PKR 30 Billion
- Owner: Government of Khyber Pakhtunkhwa

Dam and spillways
- Impounds: Kaitu River
- Length: 98 m

Reservoir
- Total capacity: 1.48 billion m3
- Active capacity: 1.11 billion m3

Power Station
- Installed capacity: 83.4 MW
- Annual generation: 350 GWh

The Kurram Tangi Dam (Pashto: د کرم تنګي ډېم) is a multipurpose dam under construction on the Kaitu River in North Waziristan, Pakistan. It has an 83.4 MW power generation capacity.

== Location ==
The Kurram Tangi Dam is located across Kaitu River (which more downstream becomes the Kurram River), about 14 km upstream of Kurram Garhi Headworks and 32 km north of Bannu City in the Federally Administrated Tribal Area (FATA).

== Irrigation system ==
The project will be constructed in two phases. Stage-I consists in a 5.4 m (18 ft) tall weir on Kaitu River. It will be completed within 3 years, and allow the irrigation of 6,475 ha (16,000 acres) of land in North Waziristan Agency, while about 18MW of electricity will be generated.

The complete system will irrigate a command area of 34,147 ha (84,380 acres) and have hydro-power generation capacity of 83.4 MW. The dam is also designed to supplement 112,503 ha (278,000 acres) of existing system of Civil and Marwat Canals.

== Work Progress ==
In January 2013 USAID offered US$81 million for Keitu weir and irrigation. Italy offered US$45 Million for Command Area Development to be executed by FATA Secretariat.

On June 7, 2016, the Contract Agreement was signed and the Engineer's Order to Commence was issued a week later.

In July 2016, construction started. The foundation stone was laid on March 3, 2017, by Prime Minister Nawaz Sharif.

April 2019 was the estimated completion date for phase I. Construction works for phase II had not started yet as of February 2020.

The physical progress of the project is around 60.75%.

== See also ==
- List of dams and reservoirs in Pakistan
