= Katzarah Dam =

- Location within Pakistan
- Official name: کٹزارہ ڈیم
- Country: Pakistan
- Location: Skardu, Gilgit-Baltistan
- Coordinates: 35°19′41″N 75°36′59″E
- Status: Pre-feasibility study
- Construction began: Not yet started
- Opening date: TBD
- Owner: Government of Pakistan

Dam and spillways
- Impounds: Three Rivers
- Height: 860

Reservoir
- Total capacity: 35 million acre-feet (43 km^{3})

Power Station
- Installed capacity: 15000 MW (max. planned)

The Katzarah Dam is a proposed dam located near Shyok, Shigar River, and Indus rivers in Pakistan. If built it would be Pakistan's largest dam.

== Site ==
The dam site is about 18 km downstream of Skardu, Pakistan and would create storage in three gorges. The average annual flow in the Indus River at the site is nearly 31.8 billion cubic meters.

== Storage and power ==
The Katzarah dam would create a reservoir up to 35 million acre-feet (43 km^{3}), the largest in Pakistan and six times larger than Kalabagh Dam or Basha. The largest reservoir is Kariba Dam lake which is 150 million acre-feet (190 km^{3}). It would be able to generate about 1500 MW of power. Which is 10% of what it was to be believed (15,000MW).

== History ==
WAPDA Engineer Fateh Ullah discovered the dam site in 1957 by looking at the GTS maps later on he prepared a pre-feasibility report in April 1962. President Muhammad Ayub Khan requested the World Bank to send its experts to identify dam sites in Pakistan and other water resources projects. In 1968, Dr Pieter Lieftnick of the World Bank and his team identified Katzarah dam site near Skardu among others and called it Skardu dam. Confusion is being created by calling Katzarah as Skardu, the two different dam sites namely Katzarah and Skardu are 22 km apart. Therefore, both cannot be called Skardu. The World Bank Team fixes the site for Skardu Dam on the upstream of Skardu town. It is immediately located on the downstream of the confluence of Shigar River with Indus River where a gauge site has since been established for the purpose. At this location the height of Skardu Dam is fixed as 310 feet, length 3700 feet and storage capacity as 8 maf. For confirmation reference may be made to Dr Pieter Lieftnick's report — pages 283 and 296.
