= Zhob River =

River in Pakistan

Coordinates: 32°04′N 69°51′E

Zhob
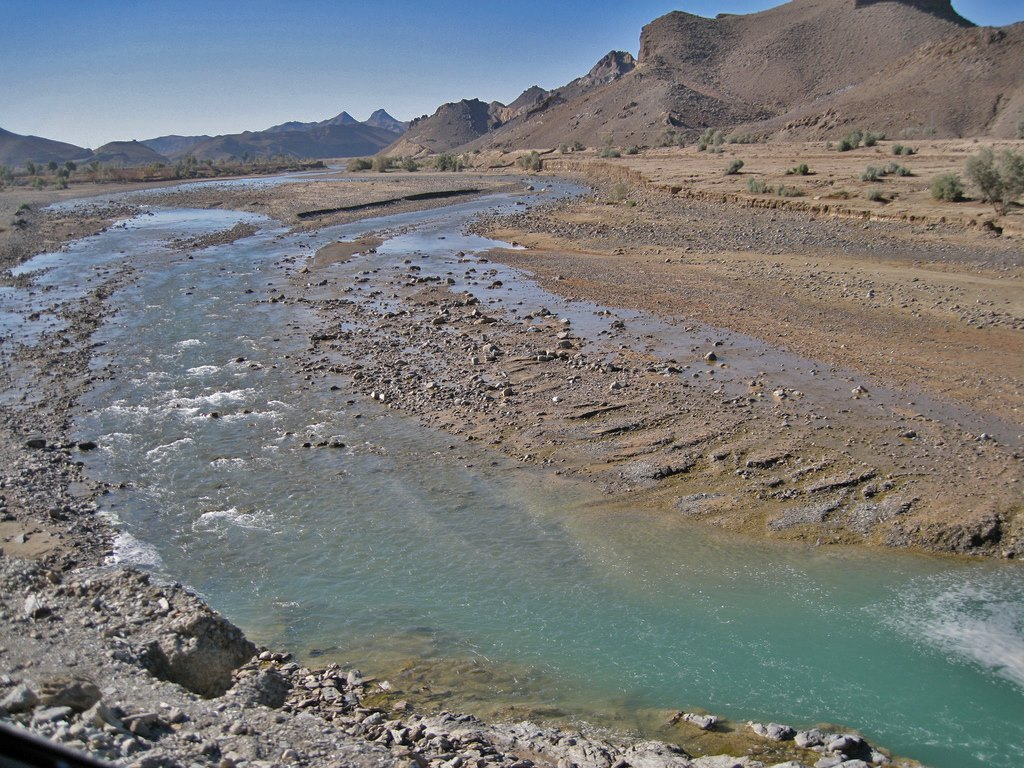

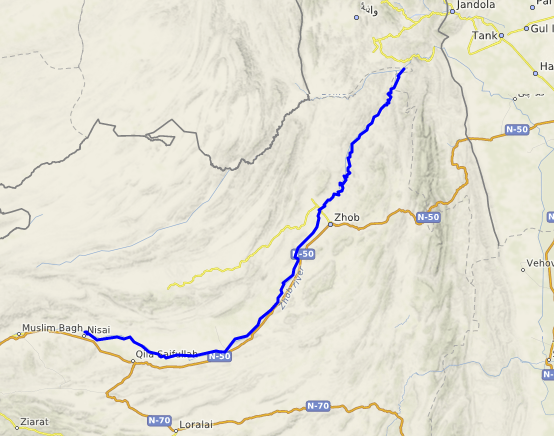
- Course of the Zhob

Location
- Country: Pakistan
- Province: Balochistan
- District: Zhob

Physical characteristics
- Source: Near Tsari Mehtarazai
- Mouth: Gomal River
  - location: Khajuri Kach
- Length: 410 km (250 mi)

Zhob River (Pashto: ږوب سيند; Urdu: دریائے ژوب) flows in the Balochistan and Khyber Pakhtunkhwa provinces of Pakistan. The total length of the Zhob River is 410 km, and it generally follows a northeasterly course.

== Etymology ==
In the Pashto language, Zhob means "oozing water". Linguistically, the name is Irano-Aryan in origin and compares etymologically to those of the Little Zab and Great Zab rivers in the Tigris Basin.

== Course ==
The Zhob River originates in the Kan Mehtarzai range (Tsari Mehtarzai Pass) near Muslim Bagh. It passes about 4 km west of the city of Zhob. As a tributary of the Gomal River, which it joins near Khajuri Kach, the Zhob forms a part of the Indus River Basin.

== Agriculture ==
The Zhob River is used to irrigate the land in northern Balochistan along with the Gomal River, making the fertile soil available for agriculture. Although in the 1960s and 1970s degradation of the channel of the Zhob decreased the irrigable acreage.

== Archaeology ==
Along the Zhob River there are located the ancient sites of Rana Ghundai, Periano Ghundai, Rehman Dheri, along with the nearby site of Gumla, which go before 3000 BC.
