= Mohmand Dam =

Dam in Khyber Pakhtunkhwa, Pakistan

- Location within Pakistan
- Official name: Mohmand Dam
- Location: Mohmand District, Khyber Pakhtunkhwa, Pakistan
- Coordinates: 34°21′11.49″N 071°31′58.72″E
- Status: Under Construction
- Construction began: 02 May 2019
- Opening date: Dec 2027 (est.)
- Construction cost: Rs. 340 billion (US$1.2 billion)
- Owner: Government of Pakistan
- Operator: Water and Power Development Authority (WAPDA)

Dam and spillways
- Type of dam: Concrete-faced rock-filled
- Impounds: Swat River
- Height: 698.82 ft (213.00 m)
- Length: 2,500 ft (760 m)

Reservoir
- Creates: Mohmand Reservoir

Power Station
- Installed capacity: 800 MW
- Annual generation: 2407 GWh

Mohmand Dam (previously known as Munda Dam) is an under construction multi-purpose concrete-faced rock-filled dam located on the Swat River approximately 37 km north of Peshawar and 5 km upstream of Munda Headworks in Mohmand District, Khyber Pakhtunkhwa, Pakistan.

Once completed, the dam will generate 800 MW of hydroelectricity, would irrigate 6,515 ha (16,100 acres) of land and control floods downstream. It is expected to provide numerous estimated annual benefits including Rs. 4.98 billion in annual water storage benefits, Rs. 19.6 billion in power generation benefits by generating 2.4 billion units of electricity annually and Rs. 79 million in annual flood mitigation benefits.

Mohmand Dam is also expected to protect Nowshera and Charsadda districts from seasonal floods by storing peak flood water in its reservoir and releasing it in dry seasons. In December 2010, in the aftermath of the July 2010 floods in Pakistan, the Pakistan Supreme Court had constituted a flood inquiry commission to investigate the damage caused by the July floods that engulfed the country and caused unprecedented damage to life and property. In its report, the commission noted that if the Mohmand Dam had been constructed, there would have been minimal damage downstream in Charsadda, Peshawar and Nowshera districts and Munda Headworks.

The reservoir that will be created behind the dam would also provide recreational facilities and promote fisheries.

== Planning and Financing ==
The initial feasibility study of the Mohmand Dam Project was completed in March 2000. Subsequently, Pakistan's Ministry of Water & Power awarded a review of the initial feasibility study to an American firm, AMZO LLC, which submitted a revised feasibility study to the Private Power Infrastructure Board (PPIB). The Ministry of Water & Power reassigned the project to Pakistan's Water and Power Development Authority (WAPDA) for carrying out detailed engineering design and construction of the project. Revised Project Cost (PC-II) amounting estimate to Rs. 648.324 million was approved by CDWP subject to availability of foreign funding.

Expression of Interest (EOI) for shortlisting of consultants for detailed engineering design and preparation of tender documents were received on 23 November 2010. Nine firms/joint ventures (JVs) submitted EOI documents out of which five firms/JVs were shortlisted and RFP issued to shortlisted firms. Technical and financial proposals from shortlisted firms for detailed engineering design and preparation of tender documents were invited on 6 July 2011. A consortium of consulting firms comprising include (i) SMEC(Australia), (ii) NK (Japan) and (iii) NESPAK-ACE-BAK (Pakistan) were finalized as the detailed engineering design consultants for the project in August 2011. Currently, the dam is in final detailed design.

France has granted Euro 61 million (Rs. 8.5 Billion) funding for two hydropower projects in Pakistan. The two projects were :Munda hydropower project (800 MW) located in Mohmand Agency, KPK and Harpo hydropower project (35 MW) in the Gilgit-Baltistan, Skardu region.

Mohmand Dam detailed engineering design was completed in April, 2017. - Its PC-1 approved by CDWP on 19-3-2018 - Its PC-I approved by ECNEC on 26-4-2018 - Rs 2 billion allocated in PSDP 2018–19 to start the project in 2019 after completion of procedures.

After completion of initial planning, study, financing, consultation and cooking up by previous governments finally, construction started in 2019. Its expected completion year is 2026.

On May 21, 2019, WAPDA signed the contract agreement worth Rs9.98 billion with a joint venture namely Mohmand Dam Consultants Group (MDCG) for consultancy services, construction design, construction supervision and contract management of Mohmand Dam Hydropower Project. The JV, led by NESPAK, comprised six partners and seven sub-consultants (four foreign and nine local firms). It is pertinent to mention that a Pakistani engineering firm had been assigned the lead role in the contract for consultancy services in such a mega water sector project for the first time in the history of Pakistan for capacity building of the local engineering firms and making them at par with the known international consultants.

== Salient features ==
Dam:
Type: Concrete-Faced Rock-Filled
Length: 760 m (2,500 ft)
Height: 213.00 m (698.82 ft)
Width: N/A

Reservoir Capacity:
Gross: 1.595 cubic kilometres (1.293×10^{6} acre⋅ft)
Live: 0.676 MAF
Dead: 0.617 MAF
Flood: 0.810 MAF

Power Generation estimate:
Maximum Capacity: 800 MW

Command Area:
Total: 6,880 ha (17,000 acres)

Construction:
Construction Period estimated: 5 years + 8 months

== See also ==
- List of dams and reservoirs in Pakistan
