= Shyok Dam =

Dam in Gilgit-Baltistan, Pakistan

- Country: Pakistan
- Location: Ghanche District, Gilgit-Baltistan
- Purpose: Power
- Construction began: March 2016
- Opening date: June 2020
- Construction cost: Rs. 285.292 million
- Operator: WAPDA

Dam and spillways
- Type of dam: Earth fill and Rock-fill dam
- Impounds: Shyok River
- Height (foundation): 625 ft

Power Station
- Installed capacity: 640 MW

Shyok Dam is a multipurpose dam project on the Shyok River, about 3 km upstream of Khaplu in Ghanche District, Gilgit-Baltistan, Pakistan.

With a commencement date of March 2016, the project is planned to be completed by June 2020 according to feasibility study.
