= The China-Pakistan Economic Corridor of the Belt and Road Initiative =

2019 book by Siegfried O. Wolf

The China-Pakistan Economic Corridor of the Belt and Road Initiative: Concept, Context, and Assessment
- Author: Siegfried O. Wolf
- Language: English
- Subject: Geopolitics
- Genre: Nonfiction
- Published: July 2019
- Publisher: Springer Nature
- Publication place: United States
- Media type: Paperback
- Pages: 395
- ISBN: 978-3-030-16200-9

The China-Pakistan Economic Corridor of the Belt and Road Initiative: Concept, Context, and Assessment is a nonfiction book by Siegfried O. Wolf.

== Overview ==
This book examines the implementation of the China–Pakistan Economic Corridor, a multibillion-dollar infrastructure project that is a part of China's Belt and Road Initiative, meant to connect Asia with Europe, the Middle East, and Africa.

=== Content ===
The book is divided into ten chapters that discuss and evaluate the anticipated economic and geopolitical effects on the region. In addition, it investigates the role of CPEC in the future regional cooperation and integration of subnational regions such as Balochistan, Khyber Pakhtunkhwa (including the Federally Administered Tribal Areas), and Gilgit-Baltistan.

== Reception ==
Jeremy Garlick of the Prague University of Economics and Business writes at China Report, "Wolf’s book is an essential resource for observers of China–Pakistan relations and the implementation of the BRI. Despite flaws, the book leans heavily on the author’s rich fieldwork in Pakistan and presents deep analytical insights regarding the situation on the ground."

In his review at the International Quarterly for Asian Studies, Wolfgang-Peter Zingel of the South Asia Institute writes, "The book covers developments until 2018. It is richly annotated, has a list of abbreviations, a long bibliography and an index. The author concentrates on the socio-political, international, and security aspects and provides ample good advice for decision makers in Pakistan. There is little on western China other than the Uyghur problem and hardly any comparison to other Chinese economic corridors. Attempts at determining winners and losers show often contradictory objectives. Still, to the reviewer’s knowledge it is the most encompassing study on the subject available and, thus, required reading for all interested in the political economy of economic corridors and Pakistan-China relations."

Writing for South Asia Research, Saleh Shahriar of the Northwest A&F University writes, "While the book under review makes a valuable contribution to the BRI literature and dispels myths and over-simplified ideas about the CPEC, what is missing from Wolf’s account is an exploration of the nature of the Chinese state, linking its ideological orientations and impacts on the BRI and CPEC. Overall, though, this is a very good book, which will be used as a reference tool for further studies."
