= Pakistan-China Fiber Optic Project =

Fiber-optic cable between Pakistan and China

- Cable type: Fibre-optic
- Construction finished: 13 July 2018
- Built by: Special Communications Organization; Huawei; China Telecom
- Area served: Pakistan–China
- Owner(s): Special Communications Organization

The Pakistan-China Fiber Optic Project is an 820 kilometer long optical fiber cable connecting Pakistan and China; it was laid down between the Khunjerab Pass on the China-Pakistan border and the Pakistani city of Rawalpindi. Inaugurated in July 2018, the cable was constructed as part of the China–Pakistan Economic Corridor at an estimated cost of $44 million. Groundbreaking on the project took place on 19 May 2016, in the city of Gilgit. The line was first envisaged in 2009, with Pakistan and China signing an agreement in 2013 to implement the project. However the project was not implemented until being included as part of the China Pakistan Economic Corridor. The line was built collaboratively by Pakistan's Special Communications Organization, China's Huawei, and China Telecom.

The line connects the Transit Europe-Asia Terrestrial Cable Network with that of Pakistan, which currently transmits its telecom and internet traffic through four undersea fiber optic cables, with another three undersea fiber optic cables under construction.

466.54 kilometers of the route is located in Gilgit-Baltistan, while 287.66 kilometers will be laid in Khyber Pakhtunkhwa province, 47.56 kilometers will be in Punjab province, and 18.2 kilometers in the Islamabad Capital Territory. which will be extended to Gwadar.

The project is financed by the Exim Bank of China at a concessionary interest rate of 2%, versus the 1.6% typical of other CPEC infrastructure projects.

The project has been completed and was inaugurated by Prime Minister Nasirul Mulk on 13 July 2018.
