= HydroChina Dawood Wind Power Project =

Wind farm in Sindh, Pakistan

- Country: Pakistan
- Location: Banbhore, Sindh
- Coordinates: 24°39′30″N 67°28′12″E
- Construction began: 2015
- Commission date: August 2016
- Owner: HydroChina

Wind farm
- Type: Onshore on tidal flats

Power generation
- Units operational: 33
- Make and model: Ming Yang
- Nameplate capacity: 49.5 MW

The HydroChina Dawood Wind Power Project is a wind farm which was developed as part of the China–Pakistan Economic Corridor's Early Harvest energy projects on 1,720 acres of tidal flats is located in Gharo, Sindh – approximately 80 kilometers east of Karachi. It is being developed by the Chinese firm HydroChina, and is expected to provide electricity to the Pakistani grid by August 2016.

The plant will produce approximately 50 megawatts of electricity upon completion, and will consist of 33 wind turbines each capable of generating 1.5 MW of electricity. Turbines will be sourced from China Ming Yang Wind Power Group Limited and were jointly developed with the German firm aerodyn.

Construction began in 2015, and the last turbine was installed on April 23, 2016. Electric generation is expected to commence in August 2016, It is expected that energy provided by the farm will be sufficient to provide electricity to some 100,000 households in the local area.

Total costs for the project are expected to total $115 million, with financing provided by the Industrial and Commercial Bank of China. The total power generation from this wind project is 49.5 MW.
