= Pak–China Technical and Vocational Institute =

Pak-China Technical and Vocational Institute
- Gwadar, Balochistan; Pakistan

Information
- Type: Vocational school
- Established: March 2016
- Project Cost: 943 million Pakistani rupees
- Financed by: Government of Pakistan and Government of China
- Project Progress Update: Groundbreaking held on 16 December 2019. The project was completed and inaugurated on 30 September 2021.

The Pak–China Technical and Vocational Institute at Gwadar is a vocational school which is to be set up by the government of Pakistan in Gwadar at a cost of 943 million Pakistani rupees by March 2016. The Pakistani government has allocated approximately 200 million rupees towards the project, while the remainder will be financed by the government of China.

The project is intended to impart specialized skills to local residents so that they may be employed at the Gwadar Port, which is currently under major expansion as part of the China-Pakistan Economic Corridor.
