= Gwadar Coal–Power Plant =

Coal-fired power plant in Gwadar, Pakistan

- Country: Pakistan
- Location: Gwadar, Balochistan
- Status: Operational
- Commission date: 2023 (expected)

Thermal power station
- Primary fuel: Coal

Power generation
- Nameplate capacity: 300 MW

The Gwadar Coal–Power Plant represents a 300-megawatt (MW) coal-fired power facility situated in Gwadar, Balochistan, Pakistan. It is part of the China-Pakistan Economic Corridor (CPEC).

== Project details ==
The power plant is projected to meet the energy demands of approximately 150,000 residents in the Gwadar region by the conclusion of 2023, aligning with the 2050 Master Plan of Gwadar. Former Federal Minister for Planning, Development & Special Initiatives Ahsan Iqbal granted approval for this initiative and set a completion target for January 2025. The power plant holds immense importance in strengthening energy collaboration between China and Pakistan, advancing the Belt and Road Initiative, enhancing the power infrastructure in Balochistan, and propelling economic growth in the Gwadar Port locality.

== Controversies ==
The National Electric Power Regulatory Authority (Nepra) has expressed concerns about relying exclusively on imported coal for power generation at the 300MW Gwadar coal-fired power plant. Nepra raised multiple inquiries about the decision to utilize solely imported coal instead of considering indigenous or Thar coal for the 300 MW Gwadar coal-based power facility. However, it was clarified that both the Prime Minister and the Planning Commission had instructed to proceed with the installation of the Gwadar coal-fired plant using imported coal.
