= Burhan, Attock District =

Coordinates: 33°48′58″N 72°34′59″E

Burhan, Pakistan
- Village
- Location within Pakistan
- Country: Pakistan
- Province: Punjab
- District: Attock
- Time zone: UTC+5 (PST)

Burhan is a village located in the Attock District of Punjab, Pakistan. It is the site of a Motorway Interchange on the M1 motorway (Pakistan), which is intersected by the N-5 National Highway.

Burhan is bordered by the Haro River in the north and the green hills in the south. The city is scarcely populated and contains an ordinance factory in Wah Cantonment. State-sponsored co-institutions educate primary and secondary students, in addition to private schools.
