= Gwadar Seawater Desalination Plant =

Water desalination plant in Gwadar, Pakistan

1.2 MGD Desalination Plant
- Location within Balochistan, Pakistan
- Interactive map of 1.2 MGD Desalination Plant
- Location: Gwadar, Balochistan, Pakistan
- Coordinates: 25.110°N 62.333°E
- Daily capacity: 1.2 million gallons
- Cost: $12.7 million (estimated)
- Completion date: 4 December 2023

The Gwadar Seawater Desalination Plant is a desalination project in Gwadar, Pakistan, aimed at meeting water shortages in the city. The plant was established with the support of the Chinese government and is designed to provide clean drinking water to the residents of Gwadar. The desalination plant was inaugurated on 4 December 2023.

== Capacity and function ==
The plant can treat 1.2 million gallons of seawater per day. The water problem in Gwadar city is expected to be solved to a great extent. The plant is operational and supplies 5,000 tonnes of drinking water per day.

== Construction and development ==
The construction of the desalination plant was completed in collaboration with the Gwadar Port Authority and China Harbor Engineering Company. By November 15, 2022, about 30 percent of the construction work had been completed. The pace of work was expected to be completed before April 2023. The desalination plant was inaugurated on 4 December 2023 by Prime Minister Anwaar ul Haq Kakar.

The cost of this project was 2 billion rupees, which was financed by the Chinese government.
