= Topi, Khyber Pakhtunkhwa =

Town in Swabi District, khyber Pakhtunkhwad, Pakistan

Topi Topaye (Note: The names of these places are "Urdu-ized"—the locals do not use this pronunciation. Locally Topi = Topaye; Swabi = Swa'Baye; Tarbela = tuR'Bella; Kotha = koTa, etc.)
- Town
- Location of Topi Topi (Pakistan)
- Coordinates: 34°4′10″N 72°37′24″E
- Country: Pakistan
- Province: Khyber Pakhtunkhwa
- District: Swabi
- Tehsil: Topi
- Elevation: 335 m (1,099 ft)

Population
  - Estimate (2023): 74,867
- Time zone: UTC+5 (PST)
- Post Code: 23460
- Telephone Dialing Code: 05372-0938
- Number of Union councils: 2

Topi (Pashto: ټوپۍ) is a town in the eastern part of the Swabi District of Khyber Pakhtunkhwa province of Pakistan.

The administrative division of Topi unfolds into two Union councils: Topi East and Topi West. Notably, the Tarbela Dam, largest earth-filled dam in the world, is located only 9 kilometres (5.6 mi) east of Topi.

== Geography ==
Topi is located in the eastern part of the Swabi District. It is also situated to the west of the Tarbela Dam, the world's largest earth filled dam.

=== Tarbela Dam ===
Tarbela Dam is the largest hydroelectric generation project in Pakistan producing 3,495 megawatts of electricity accounting for 40 percent of the Water and Power Development Authority's total power output as of 1980. It is at located at a narrow spot in the Indus River valley, named after the town of Tarbela. Tarbela Dam is located partially in the Swabi district (Topi) and partially in the Haripur district of Khyber Pakhtunkhwa, Pakistan.

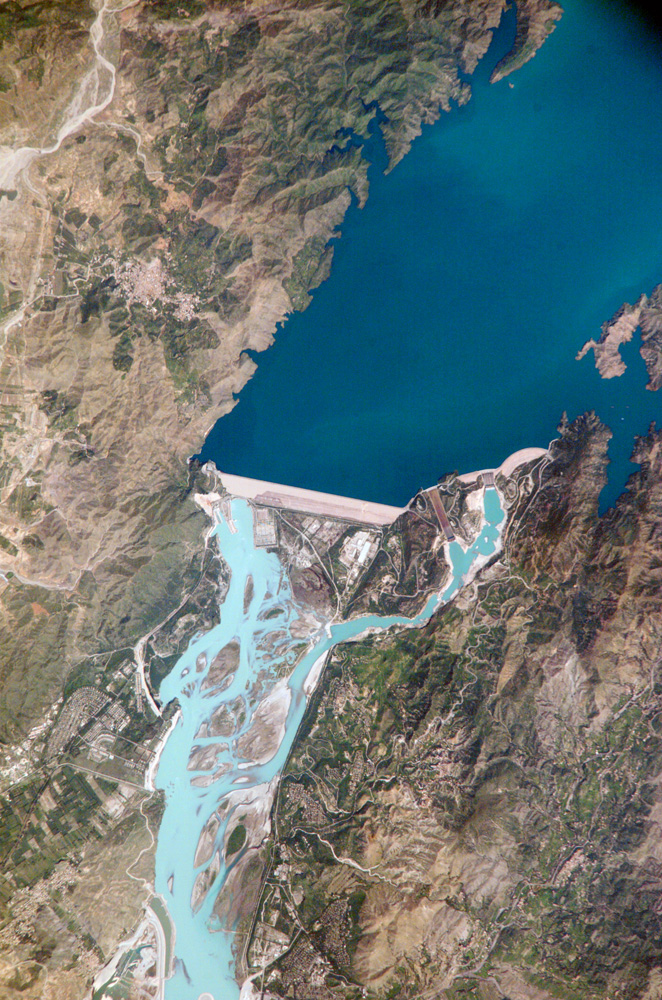
Tarbela Lake was formed as a reservoir behind a dam

The main dam wall, built of earth and rock fill, stretches 2,743 metres (8,999 ft) from the island to river right, standing 148 metres (486 ft) high. A pair of concrete auxiliary dams spans the river from the island to river left. The dam's two spillways are on the auxiliary dams rather than the main dam. The main spillway has a discharge capacity of 18,406 cubic metres per second (650,000 cu ft/s) and the auxiliary spillway, 24,070 cubic metres per second (850,000 cu ft/s). Annually, over 70% of water discharged at Tarbela passes over the spillways and is not used for hydropower generation.

Five large tunnels were constructed as part of Tarbela Dam's outlet works. Hydroelectricity is generated from turbines in tunnel 1 through 3, while tunnels 4 and 5 were designed for irrigation use. Both tunnels are to be converted to hydropower tunnels to increase Tarbela's electricity-generating capacity. These tunnels were originally used to divert the Indus River while the dam was being constructed.

MA hydroelectric power plant on the right side of the main dam houses 14 generators fed with water from outlet tunnels 1, 2, and 3. There are four 175 MW generators on tunnel 1, six 175 MW generators on tunnel 2, and four 432 MW generators on tunnel 3, for a total generating capacity of 3,478 MW.

Tarbela Reservoir is 80.5 kilometres (50.0 mi) long, with a surface area of 250 square kilometres (97 sq mi). The reservoir initially stored 11,600,000 acre-feet (14.3 km^{3}) of water, with a live storage of 9,700,000 acre-feet (12.0 km^{3}), though this figure has been reduced over the subsequent 35 years of operation to 6,800,000 acre-feet (8.4 km^{3}) due to silting. The Maximum Elevation of the reservoir is 1,550 feet (470 meters) above MSL and Minimum Operating Elevation is 1,392 feet (424 meters) above MSL. The catchment area upriver of the Tarbela Dam is spread over 168,000 square kilometres (65,000 sq mi) of land largely supplemented by snow and glacier melt from the southern slopes of the Himalayas. There are two main Indus River tributaries upstream of the Tarbela Dam. These are the Shyok River, joining near Skardu, and the Siran River near Tarbela.

=== Ghazi-Barotha Hydropower Project ===
The Ghazi-Barotha Hydropower Project is a 1,450 MW run-of-the-river hydropower connected to the Indus River near Topi. Construction of the project that began in 1995 consists of 5 generators each with a maximum power generation capacity of 290MW. Inauguration of the plant on 19 August 2003 by the then president General Pervez Musharraf also saw the commissioning of the first 2 of the 5 generators i.e. Unit 1 and Unit 2. The last generator was commissioned on 6 April 2004 and the project was completed by that December. It cost US$2.1 billion with funding from Pakistan's Water and Power Development Authority (WAPDA), the World Bank, Asian Development Bank, Japan Bank for International Cooperation, Kreditanstalt für Wiederaufbau, European Investment Bank and Islamic Development Bank.

About 1,600 cubic meter per second of water is diverted from the Indus River near the town of Ghazi, Khyber Pakhtunkhwa, about 7 km downstream of Tarbela Dam (3,478 MW). It then runs through a 100-metre wide and 9-metre deep open power channel which is entirely concrete along its 52 km length down to the village of Barotha where the power complex is located. In the reach from Ghazi to Barotha, the Indus River inclines by 76 meters over a distance of 63 km. After passing through the powerhouse, the water is returned to the Indus. In addition to these main works, transmission lines stretch 225 km.

== Demographics ==
=== Population ===
Historical population
Year	Pop.	±% p.a.
1951	...	—
1961	...	—
1972	14,914	—
1981	...	—
1998	30,458	—
2017	52,983	+2.96%
2023	74,867	+5.93%

As of the 2023 census, Topi had a population of 74,867.

== Education sector ==
The town of Topi is home of the Ghulam Ishaq Khan Institute of Engineering Sciences and Technology (GIKI), named after Ghulam Ishaq Khan, a former President of Pakistan who had served at Topi during his illustrious career as a civil servant.

== Notable people ==
- Sahibzada Abdul Qayyum Khan, a Pashtun educationist and politician, was born in Topi
- Bayazid Pir Roshan, the sixteenth century revolutionary Pashtun leader, died in Topi
- Masood Khan, 1900–1993, who was a frequent contributor to the works of aforementioned Sahibzada Abdul Qayyum, and local arms dealer and manufacturer, was born in Topi.
- Aurangzeb Khan, July 1926 – 2010, son of aforementioned Masood Khan.
