= Shekh Chuhr =

Sheikh Chor شیخ چوڑ
- Location in Pakistan
- Coordinates: - 4000) 33°58′18″N 72°33′20″E
- Country: Pakistan
- Province: Khyber Pakhtunkhwa
- District: Haripur
- Tehsil: Ghazi
- Region: Hazara

Area
  - Total: 9 km^{2} (3.5 sq mi)

Population
  - Total: 3,000 - 4,000
  - Religions: Islam
- Time zone: UTC+5 (PST)
  - Summer (DST): +6
- Postal code span: 22860
- Area code: 0995

Sheikh Chor شیخ چوڑ is a village located in the Hazara Division of Haripur District of Khyber Pakhtunkhwa, bordering Naqarchian/Mian Dheri in Tehsil Ghazi, Haripur. Its inhabitants speak the Hindko as their primary language. The population of Sheikh Chor is approximately 4,000.

== Location ==
The village is located at 33°58'18N 72°33'20E with an altitude of 321 metres (1053 feet).
