= Kundi =

Kundi may refer to:

- Kundi (film), Urdu film from Pakistan
- Kundi (harp)
- Kundi (Pashtun tribe), in Pakistan
- Kundi (stealing power), the practice of stealing electric power in some parts of Brazil, India, Pakistan and Turkey
- Kundi, Ethiopia, a town in Guradamole, Somali
- Kundi, Haripur, in Pakistan
- Kundi, Uttar Pradesh, a village in India
- An Assyrian fortress probably identical with later Cyinda
