= Supercomputing in Pakistan =

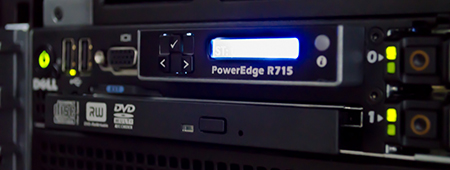
high-performance computing cluster, PowerEdge R715, at Ghulam Ishaq Khan Institute

Pakistan's high-performance supercomputing program began in the mid-to-late 1980s, when the country was denied access to Cray supercomputers. Since then the growth of information technology in Pakistan has driven the development of domestic supercomputing capabilities.

== Background ==
But what about supercomputer exports to India or Pakistan? Will they be used to advance the nations' economies or to speed development of nuclear weapons?

— A passage in Fundamentals of International Business, p. 78 discussing U.S. technological export policy.

During the early 1980s, several large institutions in Pakistan fueled the country's initial interest in the research and development of supercomputing. During this period, senior scientists at the Pakistan Atomic Energy Commission (PAEC) were the first to engage in research on high-performance computing, while calculating and determining exact values involving fast-neutron calculations. According to one scientist involved in the project, a team of senior PAEC scientists developed powerful computerized electronic codes and acquired powerful high-performance computers to design the system, ultimately producing the first manufacturable design for the atomic bomb project.

Scientific research with supercomputers was carried out by physicist M.S. Zubairy at the Institute of Physics of Quaid-e-Azam University. Zubairy published two books on quantum computers and high-performance computing throughout his career that are currently taught worldwide. During the 1980s and 1990s, mathematician Dr. Tasneem Shah carried out scientific research and mathematical work at the Kahuta Research Laboratories to solve additive problems in computational mathematics and statistical physics using the Monte Carlo method.

In the 1990s, Khan Research Laboratories deployed a series of supercomputer systems at its site, creating one of the fastest computers in the nation at that time.

Technological imports in supercomputers were denied to Pakistan, as well as India, due to an arms embargo. This was because foreign powers feared that the technology could be used for developing nuclear weapons in the 1990s. To help US-based companies gain competitive ground in developing information technology-based markets, the U.S. government eased regulations on exporting high-performance computers to Pakistan and four other technologically developing countries during the Bush administration. The new regulations allowed these countries to import supercomputer systems that were capable of processing information at a speed of 190,000 million theoretical operations per second (MTOPS) compared to the previous limit of 85,000 MTOPS.

== List of organizations with supercomputers in Pakistan ==
Site	Name	Manufacturer	Architecture	Year Established	Rmax (TFlop/s)	Rpeak (TFlop/s)
Namal Institute Centre for AI and Big Data	Pakistan Supercomputing	Dell	Cluster (CPU + GPU + FPGA)	2023	1,100	3,500
Pak-Austria Fachhochschule: Institute of Applied Sciences and Technology, Haripur	PowerGrid	Lenovo	Cluster (CPU + GPU)	2021	480	2,500
National University of Sciences & Technology (NUST), Islamabad	ScREC	HPE	Cluster (CPU + GPU)	2012	-	132
Pakistan Institute of Engineering and Applied Sciences (PIEAS), Islamabad	Dunamis	-	Cluster (CPU + GPU)	2020	-	50.8
NED University of Engineering and Technology (NEDUET), Karachi	-	-	Cluster	-	-	10
Lahore University of Management Sciences (LUMS), Lahore	-	Huawei	Cluster (CPU + GPU)	2018	-	~10
Riphah International University (Riphah), Islamabad	-	IBM	Cluster	2016	-	3.2
Kohat University of Science and Technology (KUST), Kohat	-	-	Cluster (CPU)	2008	-	0.416
Pakistan Institute of Engineering and Applied Sciences (PIEAS), Islamabad	-	SGI	MPP (CPU)	2011	-	0.384
Ghulam Ishaq Khan Institute of Engineering Sciences and Technology (GIKI), Swabi	-	Dell	Cluster (CPU + GPU)	2012	-	0.158
COMSATS University Islamabad (CUI), Islamabad	-	-	Cluster (CPU)	2012	-	0.158
University of Malakand (UoM), Chakdara	-	-	Cluster	2016	-	N/A
Khan Research Laboratories, Kahuta	-	IBM	Cluster (CPU + GPU)	1990	-	N/A (Classified)
Pakistan Institute of Nuclear Science & Technology, Nilore	-	IBM	Cluster (CPU + GPU)	1991	-	N/A (Classified)

== Supercomputing programmes ==
=== University of Malakand ===
The CCMS Department of Physics at the University of Malakand (UOM) developed a supercomputer which began operating in 2016. It is heavily used by graduate students, PhD scholars, faculty members of UOM, and researchers from other organizations. The supercomputer has two servers used as head nodes and 24 machines used as compute nodes. It has been mostly used for simulation and modeling by the researchers in the materials science and chemistry departments.

=== Ghulam Ishaq Khan Institute of Engineering Sciences and Technology ===
The Ghulam Ishaq Khan Institute of Engineering Sciences and Technology (GIKI) has a supercomputer program. Under the supervision of Dr. Masroor Hussain, this facility was funded by the Directorate of Science and Technology (DoST) of the Government of Khyber Pakhtunkhwa in 2012. This system provides a test bed for shared memory systems, distributed memory systems, and Array Processing using OpenMP, MPI-2 and CUDA specifications, respectively.

=== COMSATS Institute of Information Technology ===
The COMSATS Institute of Information Technology (CIIT) has been actively involved in research in the areas of parallel computing and computer cluster systems. In 2004, CIIT built a cluster-based supercomputer for research purposes. The project was funded by the Higher Education Commission of Pakistan. The Linux-based computing cluster, which was tested and configured for optimization, achieved a performance of 158 GFLOPS. The packaging of the cluster was locally designed.

=== National University of Sciences and Technology ===
The National University of Sciences and Technology (NUST) in Islamabad has developed the fastest supercomputing facility in Pakistan to date. The supercomputer, which operates at the university's Research Centre for Modeling and Simulation (RCMS), was inaugurated in September 2012. The supercomputer has parallel computation abilities and has a performance of 132 teraflops per second (i.e., 132 trillion floating-point operations per second), making it the fastest graphics processing unit (GPU) parallel computing system currently in operation in Pakistan. It has multi-core processors and graphics co-processors, with an inter-process communication speed of 40 gigabits per second.

=== Khan Research Laboratories ===
In the 1990s, Khan Research Laboratories (KRL) became the nation's first supercomputing site. It also became the home of a number of the most high-performance supercomputer and parallel computing systems, installed at the facility by a team of mathematicians. A parallel Computational Fluid Dynamics (CFD) division was established which specialized in conducting high performance computations on shock waves in the blast effects from the outer surface to the inner core by using the difficult differential equations of the state of the materials under high pressure.

=== Kohat University of Science and Technology ===
Kohat University of Science and Technology installed a 416 GFLOPS supercomputer facility cluster, operating since at least 2008.

=== Riphah International University ===
On 22 January 2016, Riphah International University based in Islamabad announced that their team of engineers have developed a supercomputer architecture. The system supports CUDA, MPI/LAM, OpenMP, OpenCL and OpenACC programming models. It also can solve larger algorithms, numerical techniques, big data, data mining, bioinformatics and genomics, business intelligence and analytics, climate, and weather and ocean related problems.

=== UCERD Private Limited ===
UCERD Private Limited proposed and developed Pakistan's first FPGA-powered supercomputer. In 2019, the UCERD team was awarded the HEC Technology Development Fund of Rs. 16 million for the project "Development of Scalable Heterogeneous Supercomputing System".

=== Pakistan Supercomputing Centre ===
Located in the rural district of Mianwali, one of Pakistan's indigenous high-performance computing facilities is hosted by the Centre for AI and Big Data at Namal University, Mianwali. The facility, known as PakistanSupercomputing, is built around the PakSupercomputer, a heterogeneous cluster combining central processing units (CPUs), graphics processing units (GPUs) and field-programmable gate arrays (FPGAs), which has been operational since 2023 and delivers a peak performance of about 1.1 petaFLOPS. Developed in collaboration with Pakistan Supercomputing and the Barcelona Supercomputing Center, the facility supports research, teaching and industrial projects in high-performance computing, including parallel and distributed programming, distributed AI application development, and modelling and simulation. Pakistan Supercomputing has also been used to host national-level workshops and schools on supercomputing and artificial intelligence; lecture materials and laboratories from these events are made available through open-source repositories.

== See also ==
- Gaming in Pakistan
- Supercomputing in China
- Supercomputing in Europe
- Supercomputing in India
- Supercomputing in Japan
- Supercomputing in Taiwan
