= Sirya =

- Town and union council
- Interactive map of Sirya
- Coordinates: 33°56′14″N 72°53′27″E
- Country: Pakistan
- Region: Khyber Pakhtunkhwa
- District: Haripur District
- Time zone: UTC+5 (PST)

Sirya is one of the 44 union councils, administrative subdivisions, of Haripur District in the Khyber Pakhtunkhwa province of Pakistan. Sirya is located at 33°56'14N 72°53'27E and lies to the south of the district capital Haripur

Aftab Shah Nazim of the Sirya Union council. Youth councillor Of Sirya is Advocate Kashif Mehmood.
