= Jatti Pind =

Jatti pind
- Union council
- Interactive map of Jatti pind
- Coordinates: 34°3′0″N 72°57′0″E
- Country: Pakistan
- Region: Khyber Pakhtunkhwa
- District: Haripur District

Jatti Pind is one of the 44 union councils, administrative subdivisions, of Haripur District in the Khyber Pakhtunkhwa province of Pakistan. It is located to the north east of the district capital Haripur at 34°2'60N 72°57'0E.

Major villages in this union council are Jatti Pind (for which the union council is named), Kag and Alluli.
