= Salam Khand =

Pakistani village

Salam Khand, (Urdu: سلم کھنڈ), is a village of Ghazi Tehsil in the Haripur District of Khyber Pakhtunkhwa province, Pakistan. The village, which is part of Kundi Union Council, contains a government primary school and a hospital.

In 1848, during the Second Anglo-Sikh War, Chatar Singh had stationed troops in a fort in the village.
