= Pak-Austria Fachhochschule: Institute of Applied Sciences and Technology =

Public university in Haripur, Pakistan

- Type: Public
- Established: 17 September 2020; 6 years ago
- Affiliations: HEC
- Chairman: Governor of Khyber Pakhtunkhwa
- Rector: Mohammad Mujahid
- Dean: Arshad Hussain
- Students: 5,000
- Location: Haripur, Pakistan; 33°54′31.34″N 72°55′3.26″E
- Campus: Rural
- Website: paf-iast.edu.pk

Pak-Austria Fachhochschule: Institute of Applied Sciences and Technology (abbreviated as PAF IAST) is a public science and technology university located in Mang, Haripur, Khyber Pakhtunkhwa. The institute focuses on artificial intelligence, railway engineering, nanotechnology, mineral resources and agricultural technologies. It is the first foreign engineering university in Pakistan and is located about 40 miles from the capital of the country, Islamabad.

== History ==
In 2005, Atta-ur-Rahman, who was the Chairman of the Higher Education Commission (Pakistan) at the time, presented and secured approval of a Rs250 billion project to establish seven universities centred around Engineering, Science and Technology in collaboration with China and several European countries. These universities were intended to improve the Higher Education sector in Pakistan so as to enable its young population to take part in the global technology sector.

The Chairman was able to enlist the support of two Austrian scholars (Bernd Michael Rode and A Min Tjoa) through his personal contacts, who played a crucial role in the collaboration between the two countries and the establishment of the institute. Three Austrian and five Chinese universities are part of the collaboration.

The foundation stone of the institute was laid on 7 May 2016, by the then Chief Minister of Khyber Pakhtunkhwa, Pervez Khattak.

The institute was inaugurated by the then Prime Minister of Pakistan, Imran Khan on 17 September 2020.

== Campus ==
The university is located in a rural, mountainous area and has a naturally formed lake in the middle of campus.

The university has on-campus Wi-Fi, labs, auditoriums, a standard library with cubicles for group discussions and hostels for residential students. For sports and recreation, there are jogging tracks, two grounds for football and cricket, along with badminton and volleyball courts.

== Collaborations ==
In late 2020 a memorandum of understanding was established between Peshawar Zalmi Foundation and PAF-IAST for skill development and training.

In 2023, the institute and Chengdu University in China launched a joint Mechanical Engineering Technology programme, two years will be spent at the institute in Pakistan and two years will be spent at Chengdu University.

In 2024, a higher education delegation from the United Kingdom visited PAF-IAST for the formation of an international collaboration to "enrich academic experiences and drive innovation in both nations".

== See also ==
- National University of Sciences & Technology
- Ghulam Ishaq Khan Institute of Engineering Sciences and Technology
- Higher Education Commission (Pakistan)
- Science and technology in Pakistan
- Supercomputing in Pakistan
