= Pind Kamal Khan =

- Town and union council
- Country: Pakistan
- Region: Khyber Pakhtunkhwa
- District: Haripur District
- Time zone: UTC+5 (PST)

Pind Kamal Khan (Urdu: پنڈ کمال خان) is one of the 44 union councils, administrative subdivisions, of Haripur District in the Khyber Pakhtunkhwa province of Pakistan. It is a mountainous valley with two lakes, Mang and Kahl lakes.
