= Sahibzada Abdul Qayyum =

Political Agent of the British Indian Empire

Sir Sahibzada Abdul Qayyum

Chief Minister of the North-West Frontier Province
- In office 1 April 1937 – 7 September 1937
- Monarch: George VI
- Governor General: Victor Hope, 2nd Marquess of Linlithgow

Personal details
- Born: 12 December 1863 Topi, North-West Frontier Provinces, British India
- Died: 4 December 1937 (aged 73) Topi, British India

Nawab Khan Bahadur Sahibzada Sir Abdul Qayyum Khan Lodi KCIE (12 December 1863 – 4 December 1937), hailing from Topi, Swabi District, British India (modern day Khyber Pakhtunkhwa Pakistan) was an educationist and politician.

Qayyum Khan Lodi helped Mortimer Durand during his negotiation of the Durand Line agreement with Afghanistan in 1893. Qayyum Khan became the first Chief Minister of the North-West Frontier Province on 1 April 1937. He is also known for establishing the Islamia College, Peshawar on the mould of Sir Syed Ahmad Khan's policy of educating Muslims.

Sahibzada Abdul Qayyum Khan Lodi started his career as a government servant but he eventually turned into an educationist and politician.

== Early life ==
Sahibzada Abdul Qayyum was born on 12 December 1863 into a well-known religious family of Topi. His paternal family traces its lineage back to the Lodi dynasty. His maternal family traces their lineage back to Husain ibn Ali.

His paternal grandfather was Sahibzada Qutb-e-Alam (born 1800/01). His father was Sahibzada Abdur Rauf (born 1837/38). Abdur Rauf married his maternal cousin Zainab, daughter of Syed Amir (Kotha Mulla). The couple had four children; three daughters and one son. Two of the daughters died in childhood, while Khair-un-Nisa (born 1860) and Abdul Qayyum survived. His mother died when he was 3 years old and his father was assassinated by rivals when he was 10 years old. After the death of his father, he and his sister were brought to Kotha by their maternal uncle, Syed Ahmed Bacha. He studied at the local madrassah where his uncle was a teacher. He was a bright student and caught the attention of a visiting Christian missionary Reverend Hughes. Rev. Hughes used to come to Kotha for religious discussion and propagation and had befriended Abdul Qayyums' uncles. Sensing that his nephew had more potential, Syed Ahmed Bacha was eventually convinced by Hughes to send him to Peshawar for modern education. Abdul Qayyum was admitted to the Municipal Board Middle School, Peshawar City from where he passed his Vernacular school exam in 1880.

He subsequently gained admission to Edwards Mission High School, where he passed his English middle school examination in 1883. He took the examination for Naib-Tehsildar in September 1886 and passed on his first attempt.

== Early career ==
Due to the non-availability of a Naib Tehsildar post, he applied for training in Settlement Work. He eventually joined the Commissioner's Office and was employed as a Translator and Reader.

In 1887, Sahibzada Abdul Qayyum was appointed Naib Tehsildar. During this time he was part of the Black Mountain expedition of 1888. This was a punitive expedition against certain Hazara clans for unsettled offences, including the murder of several British officers. During the expedition, Abdul Qayyum had the task of sending daily reports to the various government agencies. His work was highly commended and he was awarded a silver medal, 'Hazara 88'.

He was sent to Sialkot in 1890 for settlement training.

He subsequently held several administrative portfolios, i.e., Tehsildar, Chief Political Agent of Hazara, Revenue Assistant and Treasury Officer, Extra Assistant Commissioner, Superintendent of the Commissioner's Vernacular Office, Assistant Political Agent Khyber, 'Assistant Political Agent' of Chitral, and then of Khyber Agency and then promoted to Assistant Political Agent of Khyber, Federally Administered Tribal Areas (FATA), during the period 1891 to 1919.

In the year 1893, during the rule of Amir Abdur Rahman Khan of Afghanistan a Royal Commission for demarcating the Indo-Afghan Boundary, the Durand line between Afghanistan and the British Indian Empire, was set up and the two parties camped at Parachinar, now part of FATA Pakistan, which is near Khost, Afghanistan.

From the British Indian side the camp was Attended by Sir Henry Mortimer Durand and Sahibzada Abdul Qayyum, then Assistant Political Agent Khyber. Afghanistan was represented by Sahibzada Abdul Latif and the Governor Sardar Shireendil Khan representing the King Amir Abdur Rahman Khan.

== Political career ==
In 1921, he went to visit his old friend George Roos-Keppel who was severely ill at the time. He was shown a letter from the British government wanting to appoint Roos as Viceroy of India. Roos had replied that he would accept the position on the condition that Abdul Qayyum be made Chief Commissioner of the North West Frontier Province (NWFP). However, Ross Keppel died shortly afterwards.

In 1924, he was nominated as a non-official member of the Indian Legislative Assembly and remained a member until 1932. In November 1928 he was appointed as a member of a committee to examine the educational conditions in NWFP, Delhi and Ajmer-Merwara. The committee submitted a report in 1930, with an in-depth analysis, general recommendations and specific stress on female education, sanitation and necessary changes in curricula.

He represented NWFP at the Round Table Conferences (India) during 1931-33 period.

The 1st NWFP Legislative Council was established in 1932 and Abdul Qayyum was appointed the first and sole Minister of Transferred Departments. As a consequence of the Government of India Act 1935, the NWFP status was upgraded to a governors' province, hence requiring a separate Legislative Assembly. Following the first elections in NWFP in 1937, no single political party was able to gain a majority. Sahibzada Abdul Qayyum became the first Chief Minister of the Khyber-Pakhtunkhwa on 1 April 1937. However, this government could not last more than 6 months. Owing to Indian National Congress's opposition who considered him to be the 'spokesman of British imperialism', a vote of no-confidence was passed against him in September 1937. He was replaced by the Congress ministry headed by Dr Khan Sahib. A. Qayyum died 92 days after his ouster from the office on 4 December 1937.

The achievements of his short-lived government included:

- Provision of 2.4 million rupees for the Malakand Thermal Power plant
- Establishment of a government training school in Peshawar
- Special measures were taken for the growth and expansion of educational facilities, especially Islamia College
- Removal of ban on political activities in the province, and the cancellation of 1935 administrative circular that made Urdu or English as mandatory language for instruction in government-aided schools
- There is also evidence and record of his frequent letter exchange with a man hailing from his hometown, Topi, by the name of Masood Khan, discussing matters of significant importance to the state.

== Death ==
A delegation from Islamia College, headed by the then Principal R.L. Holdsworth came to visit Abdul Qayyum at his residence in Topi on 3 December 1937. They were discussing the Silver Jubilee plans of the college, scheduled for the spring of 1938. After seeing his guests off, while walking back home he became dizzy, vomited and was about to fall down, but was supported by those around him. He was sat down on a chair. He told his kinsmen that the life was ebbing out of his limbs on one side. He soon fell into a coma and died at around 1:30 AM the next morning. It was 3 December and also Eid. His funeral was held the same day at 4pm and was attended by the Governor of NWFP and many high-ranking officials. The Eastern Times reported "... He was incomparably the greatest man that the Province had ever produced.".

After the death of Sir A. Qayyum, most of the members of his party (United Muslims Nationalist Party) joined the newly formed All-India Muslim League, electing Sardar Aurang Zeb Khan as its party leader in the assembly.

== Monuments ==
In dedication to his services, there are numerous monuments named after him,

- Sahibzada Abdul Qayyum Road in Sector I-8, Islamabad (from Khayaban-e-Johar Metro Station to I-8 Interchange on Islamabad Expressway)
- Qayyum Manzil at Islamia College
- Sahibzada Abdul Qayyum Khan Road in University Town, Peshawar
- Sahibzada Abdul Qayyum Khan Archaeological Museum, Peshawar University
- Sir Sahibzada Abdul Qayyum Khan Road in GIKI

Sir Sahibzada A.Qayyum House in The Fazlehaq College, Mardan.

Academic offices
New office	Chief Minister of Khyber Pakhtunkhwa; 1 April 1937 – 7 September 1937	Succeeded by Dr. Khan Sahib
