= Bait Gali =

- Town and union council
- Country: Pakistan
- Region: Khyber Pakhtunkhwa
- District: Haripur District

Government
  - Type: Lord
  - Young Politician / Former Youth Councilor: Khan Faraz Khan Tanoli
- Time zone: UTC+5 (PST)

Bait Gali is one of the 44 union councils of Haripur District in the Khyber Pakhtunkhwa Province of Pakistan. It is in an area prone to monsoon flooding.

Formerly, it was a part of Princely State of Amb.
