= Government Post Graduate College Haripur =

Pakistani

Coordinates: 33°59′13.6″N 72°54′4.5″E

- Address: GT Road Haripur, Pakistan
- Type: Public Sector
- Established: 1959
- Location: Haripur, Pakistan
- Website: Official Website

Government Post Graduate College Haripur is located in Haripur Khyber Pakhtunkhwa, Pakistan. The college currently offers Intermediate, Bachelor, Master and 4 years BS programms in various disciplines for which it is affiliated with University of Haripur.

== Overview & History ==
Government Post Graduate College Haripur is one of the colleges in Haripur. The college started in 1959 initially in a rented building, but in 1962. the college was moved to its current campus. The college campus has well ventilated classrooms and well equipped science laboratories.

The college started Master programmes in Mathematics and English in 2012, which were extended Chemistry in 2015. The college is now offering 4 years BS programmes in various disciplines.

== Programs ==
The college currently offers the following programs.

=== Intermediate ===
- FSc – Pre-Medical (2 years)
- FSc – Pre-Engineering (2 years)
- FSc – Computer Science (2 years)
- FA – General Science (2 years)
- FA – Humanities (2 years)

=== Master Level (2 years) ===
- MSc – Mathematics
- MSc - Chemistry
- MA - English

=== BS Degrees (4 years) ===
- BS Computer Science
- BS English
- BS Mathematics
- BS Chemistry
- BS Political Science
- BS Economics
- BS Physics
- BS Statistics
- BS Electronics
- BS Zoology
- BS Gender Studies
- BS Urdu

== See also ==
- University of Haripur
