= Nara Amaz =

Nara Amazai
- Union council
- Nara Amazai is located in Haripur District
- Country: Pakistan
- Province: Khyber Pakhtunkhwa
- District: Haripur

Nara Amazai is one of the 44 union councils, administrative subdivisions, of Haripur District in the Khyber Pakhtunkhwa province of Pakistan. It is one of the two union councils of district Haripur located at the right bank of Indus river. The other being Bait Gali.
