= Najifpur =

Union Council in Pakistan

Najafpur is one of the 44 Union Councils, administrative subdivions, of Haripur District in the North-West Frontier Province of Pakistan.
