= Pind Hasham Khan =

Town and union council in Khyber Pakhtunkhwa, Pakistan

- Town and union council
- Country: Pakistan
- Region: Khyber Pakhtunkhwa
- District: Haripur District
- Time zone: UTC+5 (PST)

Pind Hasham Khan is one of the 44 union councils, administrative subdivisions, of Haripur District in the Khyber Pakhtunkhwa province of Pakistan.
