= Haripur Central =

Haripur Central wasti Union Concil
- Town and union council
- Country: Pakistan
- Region: Khyber Pakhtunkhwa
- District: Haripur District
- Tehsil: City 1
- City 2: City 3
- Coordinator: Azeem Khan, Faisal Khan Turk

Government
  - Qazi Muhammad Raza Khan: Nazim Member DC
  - Nazim: Sardar Liaquat Ali
- Time zone: UTC+5 (PST)

Haripur Central (Urdu: ہری پور وسطی) is one of the 44 union councils, administrative subdivisions, of Haripur District in the Khyber Pakhtunkhwa province of Pakistan.
