= Dingi =

Dingi Tube Well (Dingi Tube Well # 18)
- Town and union council
- Country: Pakistan
- Region: Khyber Pakhtunkhwa
- District: Haripur District
- Established: 1800AD
- Time zone: UTC+5 (PST)
- Area code: 0995

Dingi, "Dingi Tubewell", is one of the 44 union councils, administrative subdivisions, of Haripur District in the Khyber Pakhtunkhwa province of Pakistan Post Office Kot Najeebullah, Postal Code 22620.
