= Haripur North =

- Town and union council
- Country: Pakistan
- Region: Khyber Pakhtunkhwa
- District: Haripur District
- Time zone: UTC+5 (PST)

Haripur North (Urdu: ہری پور شمالی) is one of the 44 union councils, administrative subdivisions, of Haripur District in the Khyber Pakhtunkhwa province of Pakistan.
