= Ladhar-Mang =

- Town and union council
- Location in Pakistan
- Coordinates: 34°13′19″N 72°53′41″E
- Country: Pakistan
- Region: Khyber Pakhtunkhwa
- District: Haripur District
- Time zone: UTC+5 (PST)

Ladhar-Mang is one of the 44 union councils, administrative subdivisions, of Haripur District in the Khyber Pakhtunkhwa province of Pakistan.
