= Pharhari =

Village in Haripur, Khyber Pakthunkhwa

Coordinates: 34°02′28″N 73°00′07″E

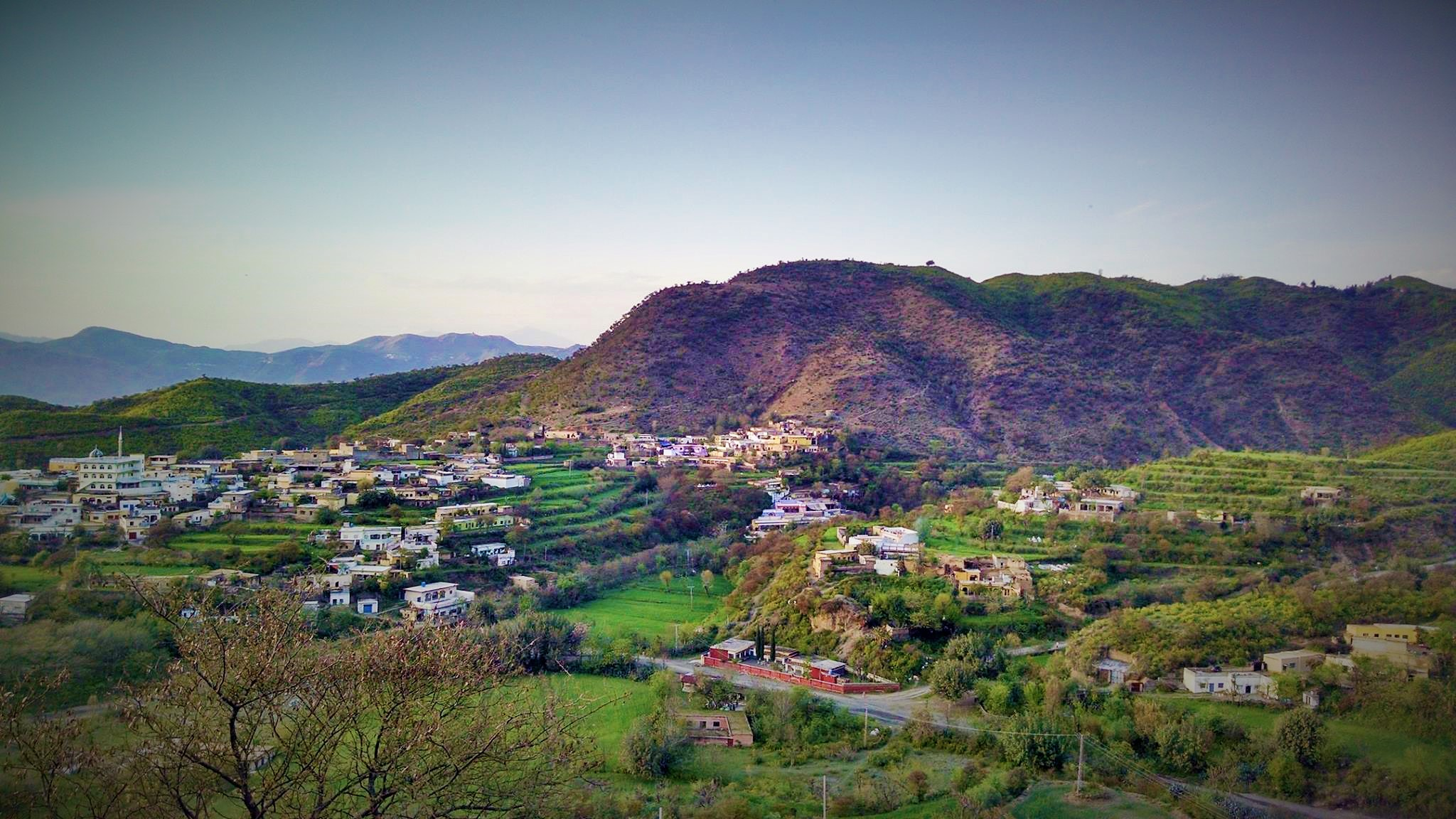
View of Pharhari Village

Pharhari is a village in the district of Haripur, Khyber Pakhtunkhwa, Pakistan. Its population is c. approximately 5,000. Pharhari is situated in a valley, surrounded by mountains on the east, north, and south. Village Pharhari is a small village located in the Haripur district of KPK, Pakistan. It is situated approximately 12 kilometers from the main city of Haripur. The village is surrounded by lush green fields and hills, and the main occupation of the residents is agriculture. The primary crops grown in the area include wheat, maize. In addition to agriculture, the village has a few small businesses, including grocery stores and small shops; (Ishaq General Store, Gohar Rehman Store and others.

The village has a relatively low literacy rate, with only a few schools and educational institutions in the area. However, various private and government organizations are working to improve educational facilities and provide better educational opportunities to the residents.

Village Pharhari is also known for its traditional handicrafts, including embroidery, weaving.

Overall, Village Pharhari is a peaceful and scenic village with friendly and welcoming residents. It offers a glimpse into the rural way of life in Pakistan and is a popular destination for tourists looking to experience the beauty of the KPK province."

== History ==
Pharhari was part of the district of Abbottabad until 1992, after which it merged with another, newly formed district.

== Localities ==
Village Pharhari is divided into several distinct localities. Some of the most notable localities within the village include the historic Mohalla Charri, which is located on a hilltop overlooking the village, and the Mohalla Neeli Dhakki, Mohalla Rakhan and Mohalla Kukar Gali.

Other notable localities within Village Pharhari include the agricultural fields that surround the village, the small businesses such as grocery stores and shops (as mentioned below - Popular Places section), and the residential areas where the friendly and welcoming residents of the village reside.

Despite its small size, Village Pharhari offers a diverse range of localities that reflect the unique cultural heritage and way of life of its residents, making it a fascinating destination for visitors to explore."

== Popular Places ==
Village Pharhari is home to several popular places that attract visitors from near and far. Some of the most notable landmarks and attractions in the village include: Jamia Masjid Ghsia Pharhari; Which is location in the middle of the village. Kathy Aali Ziarat; which is located in the center of village. Chaarhy Aaali Ziarat; which is located at the top of a mountain.
