= Tarbela Dam =

Dam in Haripur, Khyber Pakhtunkhwa, Pakistan

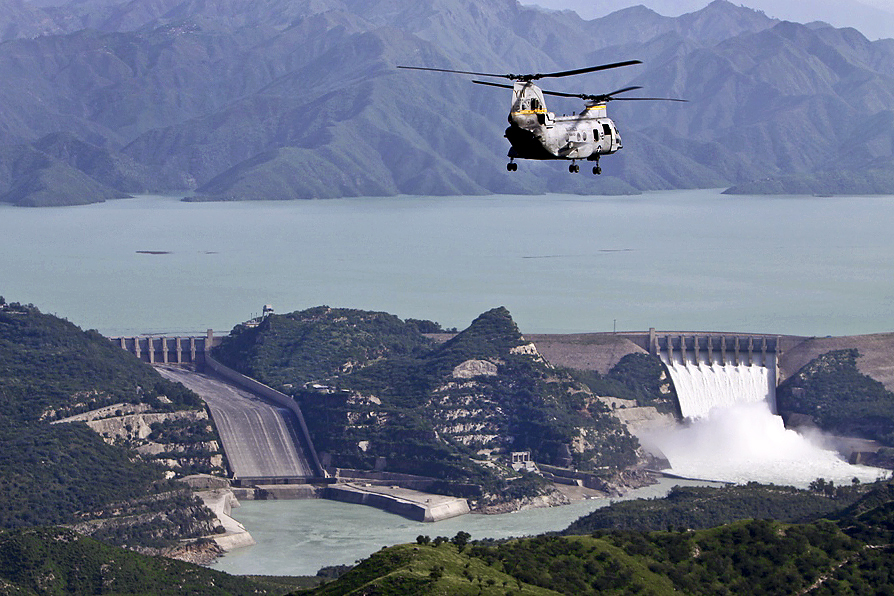
- Aerial view of the dam and Tarbela Lake reservoir

- Location within Pakistan Location within Khyber Pakhtunkhwa
- Interactive map of Tarbela Dam
- Official name: Tarbela Dam
- Location: Haripur District, Khyber Pakhtunkhwa, Pakistan
- Coordinates: 34°05′23″N 72°41′54″E
- Purpose: Water storage, Power generation
- Status: Operational
- Construction began: 1968
- Opening date: 1976 (50 years ago)
- Construction cost: 2.85 billion USD
- Owner: Government of Pakistan
- Operator: Water and Power Development Authority

Dam and spillways
- Type of dam: Earth and rock filled dam
- Impounds: Indus River
- Height (foundation): 470 feet (143 m)
- Height (thalweg): 485 feet (148 m)
- Length: 9,000 feet (2,743 m)
- Dam volume: 139,000,000 cu yd (106,000,000 m^{3})
- Spillways: 16 ( 7 Service + 9 Auxiliary)
- Spillway capacity: Service 650,000 cusecs + Auxiliary 850,000 cusecs

Reservoir
- Creates: Tarbela Reservoir
- Total capacity: 11,620,000 acre⋅ft (14.33 km^{3}) (1974)
- Active capacity: 9,679,000 acre⋅ft (11.939 km^{3}) (1974)
- Inactive capacity: 1,941,000 acre⋅ft (2.394 km^{3}) (1974)
- Catchment area: 65,500 sq mi (170,000 km^{2})
- Surface area: 100 sq mi (260 km^{2})
- Maximum water depth: 450 ft (140 m)
- Normal elevation: 1,464 ft (446 m)

Power Station
- Commission date: 1977–1982
- Turbines: 10 × 175 MW; 4 × 432 MW; 3 × 470 MW
- Installed capacity: 4,888 MW
- Annual generation: 17,395 GWh (2020)

Tarbela Dam (Pashto: د توربېلې بند, Hindko: تربیلا بند) is an earth-filled dam on the Indus River in Pakistan's Khyber Pakhtunkhwa province. It is mainly located in Swabi Tehsil. The dam lies in the vicinity of the town of Topi, 105 km (65 mi) northwest of Islamabad and 125 km (80 mi) east of Peshawar. It is the largest earth-filled dam in the world. The dam is 143 metres (470 ft) high above the riverbed, and its reservoir, Tarbela Lake, has a surface area of approximately 250 square kilometres (97 sq mi).

The Tarbela Dam is located where the Indus River emerges from the foothills of the Himalayas and enters the Pothohar Plateau. The dam has a reservoir that stores water for irrigation, flood control, and hydroelectric power generation, capturing monsoon flows and releasing water during the low-flow winter period. The average annual flow available is 101 billion cubic meters (3221 m^{3}/sec). It has a storage capacity of 11.9 billion cubic metres (3.1 trillion US gallons). The dam was completed in 1976. The installed capacity of the 4,888 MW Tarbela hydroelectric power stations will increase to 6,418 MW after completion of the planned fifth extension financed by Asian Infrastructure Investment Bank and the World Bank. Then, it will be the 12th largest hydroelectric dam in the world, for electricity production capacity.

== Project description ==
The dam is at a narrow spot in the Indus River valley, named after the village of Tarbela in the Swabi Districtwithin the Khyber Pakhtunkhwa province of Pakistan.

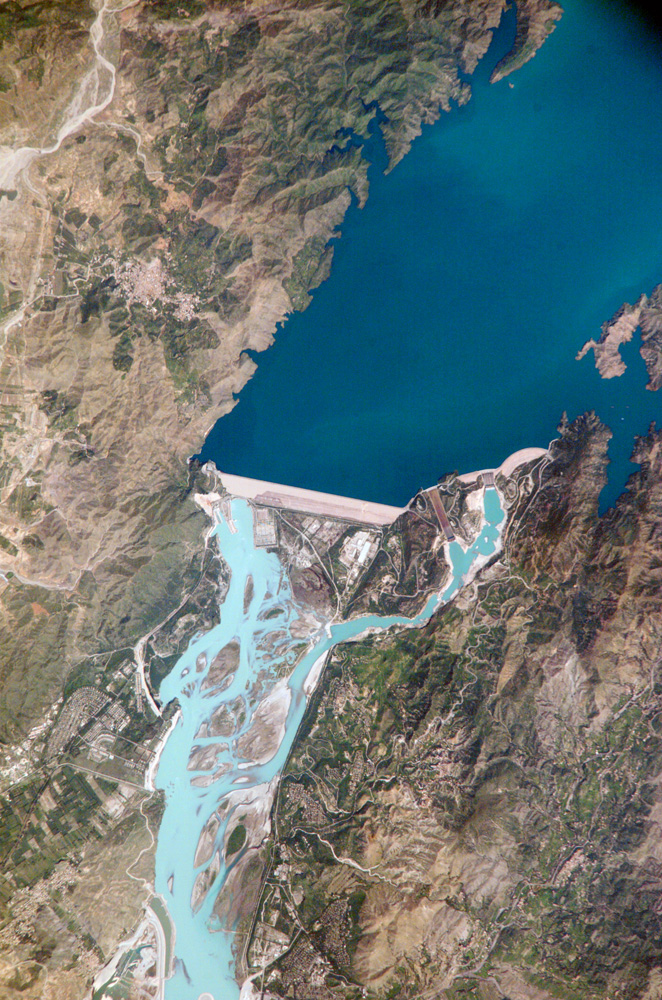
Tarbela Lake was formed as a reservoir behind the dam

The main dam wall, built of earth and rock fill, stretches 2,743 metres (8,999 ft) from the island to river right, standing 148 metres (486 ft) high. A pair of concrete auxiliary dams spans the river from the island to river left. The dam's two spillways are near the auxiliary dams rather than the main dam. The main service spillway has a discharge capacity of 18,406 cubic metres per second (650,000 cu ft/s) and the auxiliary spillway, 24,070 cubic metres per second (850,000 cu ft/s). Annually, over 70% of water discharged at Tarbela passes over the spillways without being used for hydropower generation.

Five large tunnels were constructed as part of the outlet works. Hydroelectricity is now generated from turbines in tunnel 1 through 4, while tunnel 5 is used for irrigation use. This tunnel is to be converted to hydropower use to increase Tarbela's electricity-generating capacity. The first four tunnels were originally used to divert the river while the dam was being constructed.

The Power house lies on the right bank of Indus river in the area (Right Bank Colony) of Topi tehsil of District Swabi.

Main hydroelectric power plant on the right side of the main dam houses 17 generators fed with water from outlet tunnels 1, 2, and 3. There are four 175 MW generators on tunnel 1, six 175 MW generators on tunnel 2, four 432 MW generators on tunnel 3 and three 470 MW generators on tunnel 4, for a total generating capacity of 4,888 MW.

Tarbela Reservoir is 80.5 kilometres (50.0 mi) long, with a surface area of 250 square kilometres (97 sq mi). The reservoir initially stored 14.3 cubic kilometres (11,600,000 acre⋅ft) of water, with a live storage of 12.0 cubic kilometres (9,700,000 acre⋅ft), though this figure has been reduced over the subsequent 35 years of operation to 6,800,000 acre-feet (8.4 km^{3}) due to silting. The maximum elevation of the reservoir is 470 m (1,550 ft) above MSL and the minimum operating elevation is 424 m (1,392 ft) above MSL. The catchment area upriver of the Tarbela Dam is spread over 168,000 square kilometres (65,000 sq mi) of land largely supplemented by snow and glacier melt from the southern slopes of the Himalayas. There are two main Indus River tributaries upstream of the Tarbela Dam. These are the Shyok River, joining near Skardu, and the Siran River near Tarbela.

== Background ==
Tarbela Dam was constructed as part of the Indus Basin Project after signing of the 1960 Indus Waters Treaty between India and Pakistan. The purpose was to compensate for the loss of water supplies of the eastern rivers (Ravi, Sutlej and Beas) that were designated for exclusive use by India per terms of the treaty. By the mid-1970s, power generation capacity was added in three subsequent hydro-electrical project extensions which were completed in 1992, installing a total of 3,478 MW generating capacity.

== Construction ==
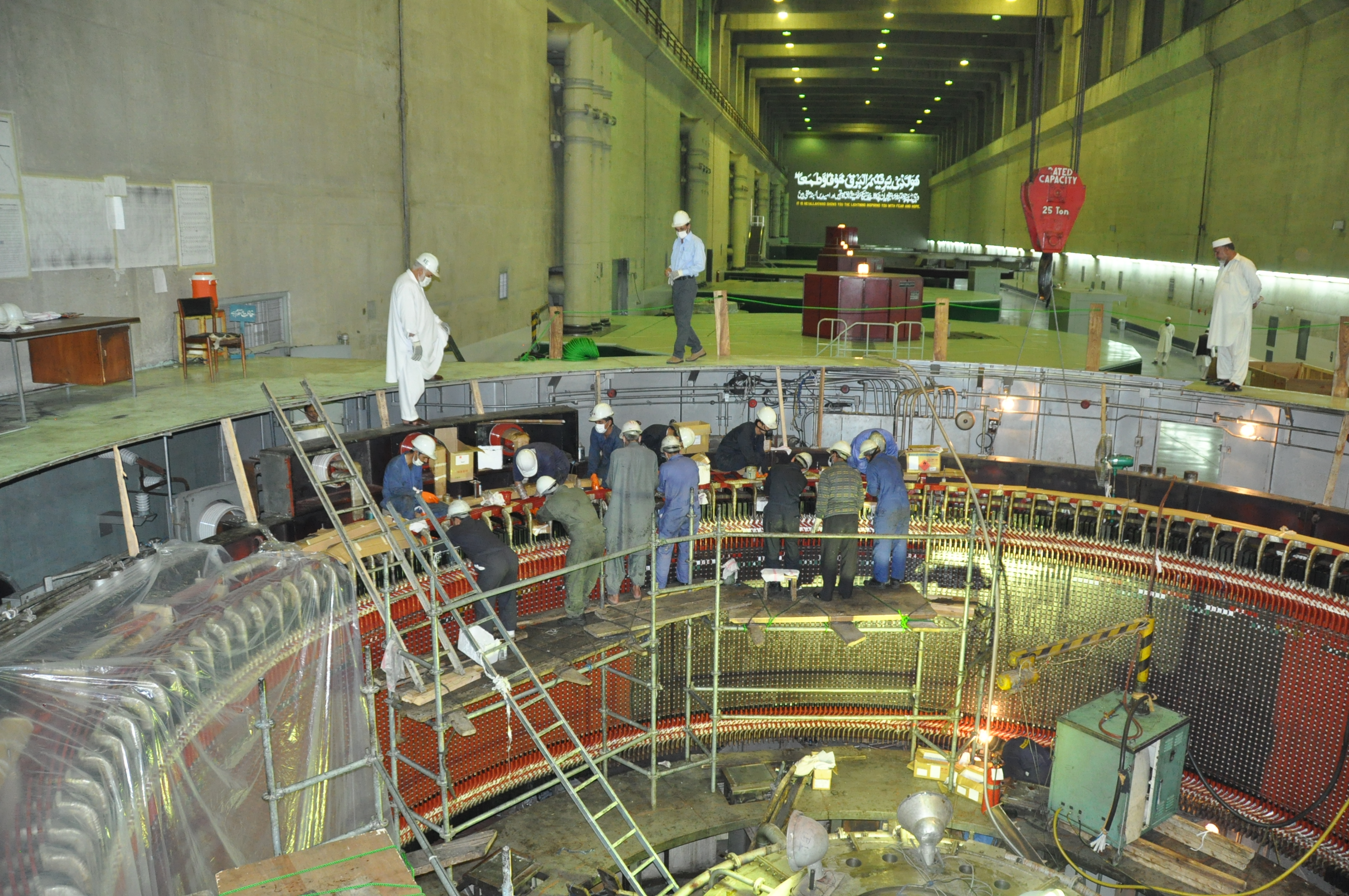
Generators in the Tarbela Dam

Construction of Tarbela Dam was carried out in three stages to meet the diversion requirements of the river. Construction was undertaken by the Italian firm Salini Impregilo.

=== Stage 1 ===
In the first stage, the Indus River was allowed to flow in its natural channel, while construction works commenced on the right bank where a 460 meters (1,500 feet) long and 211.8 meters (694.8 feet) wide diversion channel was being excavated along with a 32 meters (105 feet) high buttress dam that was also being constructed. Stage 1 construction lasted approximately 2½ years.

=== Stage 2 ===
The main embankment dam and the upstream blanket were constructed across the main valley of the river Indus as part of the second stage of construction. During this time, water from the Indus river remained diverted through the diversion channel. By the end of construction works in stage 2, tunnels had been built for diversion purposes. Stage 2 construction took 3 years to complete.

=== Stage 3 ===
Under the third stage of construction, works were carried out on the closure of the diversion channel and construction of the dam in that portion while the river was made to flow through diversion tunnels. The remaining portion of upstream blanket and the main dam at higher levels was also completed as part of stage 3 works, which were concluded in 1976.

== Mishap during construction ==
The Tarbela Dam experienced a significant construction-related mishap in 1974–75 when damage to its tunnels during initial reservoir filling prevented the planned impoundment of water. This resulted in reduced irrigation supplies and delayed commissioning of the power station, leading to lower agricultural output, increased reliance on wheat imports, and postponed hydropower generation. The incident imposed substantial economic costs, including repair expenditures and broader impacts on Pakistan’s economic growth during the mid-1970s, highlighting the dam’s critical role in the country’s agriculture and energy sectors.

== Re-settlement of people affected by Tarbela Dam ==
An area of about 260 square kilometers and about 33,000 hectares (82,000 acres) of land was acquired for construction. The large reservoir of the dam submerged 135 villages, which resulted in the displacement of a population of about 96,000 people, many of whom were relocated to townships surrounding the Tarbela Reservoir or in adjacent higher valleys.

For the land and built-up property acquired under the Land Acquisition Act of 1894, a cash compensation of Rs 469.65 million was paid to those affected. In the absence of a national policy, the resettlement concerns of the people displaced by the Tarbela Dam were addressed on an ad hoc basis. In 2011, many such people had still not been resettled or given land in compensation for their losses by the government of Pakistan, in accordance with its contractual obligations with the World Bank.

== Lifespan ==
Because the source of the Indus River is glacial meltwater from the Himalayas, the river carries huge amounts of sediment, with an annual suspended sediment load of 200 million tons. Live storage capacity of Tarbela reservoir had declined more than 33.5 per cent to 6.434 million acre feet (MAF) against its original capacity of 9.679 MAF because of sedimentation over the past 38 years. The useful life of the dam and reservoir was estimated to be approximately 50 years. However, sedimentation has been much lower than predicted, and it is now estimated that the useful lifespan of the dam will be 85 years, to about 2060.

Pakistan plans to construct several large dams upstream of Tarbela, including the Diamer-Bhasha Dam. Upon completion of the Diamer-Bhasha dam, sediment loads into Tarbela will be decreased by 69%.

== Project benefits ==
In addition to fulfilling the primary purpose of the dam, i.e., supplying water for irrigation, Tarbela Power Station has generated 341.139 billion kWh of hydro-electric energy since commissioning. A record annual generation of 16.463 billion kWh was recorded during 1998–99. Annual generation during 2007–08 was 14.959 billion kWh while the station shared peak load of 3702 MW during the year, which was 23.057% of total WAPDA system peak.

== Tarbela-IV Extension Project ==
Tarbela dam extension-IV was planned in June, 2012, and PC-1 was developed for the project. US ambassador Richard Olson offered aid for construction of this project during his visit to Pakistan, in March, 2013. In September 2013, Pakistan's Water and Power Development Authority signed a Rs. 26.053 billion contract with Chinese firm Sinohydro and Germany's Voith Hydro for executing civil works on the 1,410 MW Tarbela-IV Extension Project. Construction commenced in February 2014, and was completed in February 2018.

This project was constructed on Tunnel No. 4 of Tarbela Dam. It consists of three turbine-generator units, each with a capacity of 470 MW. The project was expected to provide an average of 3.84 billion kWh annually to the National Grid. It is intended to help supplement electricity supply during the high-demand summer months.

Annual benefits of the project were estimated at Rs. 30.7 billion. On an annual basis, over 70% of water passing through Tarbela is discharged over spillways, while only a portion of the remaining 30% is used for hydropower generation.

The Water and Power Development Authority in Pakistan says the third and last unit at its 1,410-MW Tarbela 4th Extension Hydropower Project has been synchronized with the National Grid. With this extension, the installed capacity of the Tarbela Hydel Power Station has increased to 4,888 MW.

=== Financing ===
The project's cost was initially estimated to be $928 million, but the cost was revised downwards to $651 million. The World Bank had agreed to provide an $840 million loan for the project in June 2013.

The loan had two components: The first is a $400 million International Development Association loan, which will be lent as a concessional loan at low interest rates. The second portion consists of a $440 million from the World Bank's International Bank for Reconstruction and Development. Pakistan's Water and Power Development Authority was to provide the remaining $74 million required for construction, before the project's cost was downwardly revised by $277 million. Interest costs for the loans are estimated to cost $83.5 million.

Because of revised lower costs to $651 million from $928 million, the World Bank permitted Pakistani officials to expedite completion of the project by 8 months at a cost of an additional $51 million. Pakistani officials were also permitted to divert $126 million towards the Tarbela-V Extension Project.

== Tarbela-V Extension Project ==
The Tarbela Dam was built with five original tunnels, with the first three dedicated to hydropower generation, and the remaining two slated for irrigation use. The fourth phase extension project uses the first of the two irrigation tunnels, while the fifth phase extension will use the second irrigation tunnel. Pakistan's Water and Power Development Authority sought expressions of interest for the Tarbela-V Extension Project in August 2014, and was given final consent for construction in September 2015.

The hydropower project of tunnel 5 has two major components: power generation facilities and power evacuation facilities. The major works included under the project are modifications to tunnel 5 and building a new power house and its ancillaries to generate about 1,800GWh of power annually, a new 50 km of 500kV double-circuit transmission line from Tarbela to the Islamabad West Grid Station for power evacuation, and a new 500kV Islamabad West Grid Station.

Construction commenced in August 2021 and will require an estimated 3.5 years for completion. New completion date is December 2026. The project will require the installation of three turbines with a capacity of 510 MW each in Tarbela's fifth tunnel which was previously dedicated to agricultural use. Upon completion, the total power generating capacity of Tarbela Dam will increase to 6,418 MW. As of January 2027 first unit is scheduled to start electricity generation in April 2027.

=== Financing ===
In November 2015, the World Bank affirmed that it would finance at least $326 million of the project's estimated $796 million cost which includes $126 million of funding that was diverted from the $840 million fourth phase extension project after costs for that project were revised downwards. In September 2016, the World Bank approved an additional financing of $390 million for the fifth extension hydropower project of Tarbela dam that will support the scaling up of the power generation capacity by adding 1,530 megawatts to the existing tunnel 5.

The project will be financed by the International Bank for Reconstruction and Development (IBRD), with a variable spread and 20-year maturity, including a six-year grace period. This will be the first World Bank-supported project in South Asia to be jointly financed with the Asian Infrastructure Investment Bank (AIIB) which will be providing $300m and the Government of Pakistan $133.5m. The total cost of the project is $823.5m.

== See also ==
- List of dams and reservoirs in Pakistan
- List of barrages and headworks in Pakistan
- List of power stations in Pakistan
- Satpara Dam
- Allai Khwar Hydropower Project
- Gomal Zam Dam
- Katzarah Dam
