= ScREC =

Supercomputer in Pakistan

- Active: September 2012
- Operators: Research Centre for Modeling and Simulation (RCMS), NUST
- Location: Research Centre for Modeling and Simulation, NUST, Islamabad, Pakistan
- Storage: 21.6 TeraByte
- Speed: 132 TeraFLOPS
- Purpose: Multipurpose

ScREC is a supercomputer developed by the Research Centre for Modeling and Simulation (RCMS) at the National University of Sciences and Technology, Pakistan (NUST) in Islamabad, Pakistan. With a 132 teraflops performance, it is currently the fastest supercomputer in Pakistan.

== System specifications ==
ScREC is able to perform parallel computing and has a performance speed of 132 teraFLOPS (trillion operations per second). It is the fastest running graphics processing unit (GPU) parallel computing system to have been developed in Pakistan. The supercomputer has multi-core processors and graphics co-processors, with an inter-process communication speed of 40 gigabits per second. According to system specifications, the computer cluster consists of 66 nodes equipped with 30,992 processor cores. Additional component details include:

- 32 dual quad core computer nodes (256 processor cores)
- 32 Nvidia graphics processing units
- QDR InfiniBand interconnection
- 21.6 TB storage

== See also ==
- Information technology in Pakistan
- Supercomputing in Pakistan
