= Hazara Waterfalls =

Eight waterfalls in Haripurh, Pakistan

- ہزارہ آبشار جب وادی
- Interactive map of Hazara Waterfalls
- Location: Jab Valley, Haripur District, Khyber Pakhtunkhwa, Pakistan
- Coordinates: 33°52′2″N 73°0′7″E
- Type: Tiered waterfalls
- Elevation: 850–900 m (approx.)
- Watercourse: Seasonal streams of Jab Valley
- https://hazarawaterfalls.org/

The Hazara Waterfalls (Urdu: ہزارہ آبشار جب وادی) are a group of eight waterfalls located in the Jab Valley of Haripur District, Khyber Pakhtunkhwa, Pakistan. The waterfalls were discovered in 2021 by Hassan Nisar, through the use of a drone.

== Geography ==
The Hazara Waterfalls are situated in the mountainous Jab Valley of Haripur District, approximately 25 kilometres from Haripur city and about 60–80 kilometres from Islamabad.

The falls include eight distinct cascades of varying height and flow. Some are surrounded by rock formations, while others form natural pools that attract visitors.
