= Tarbela Lake =

Coordinates: 34°9′1.37″N 72°48′14.09″E

Tarbela Lake Turbela Lake
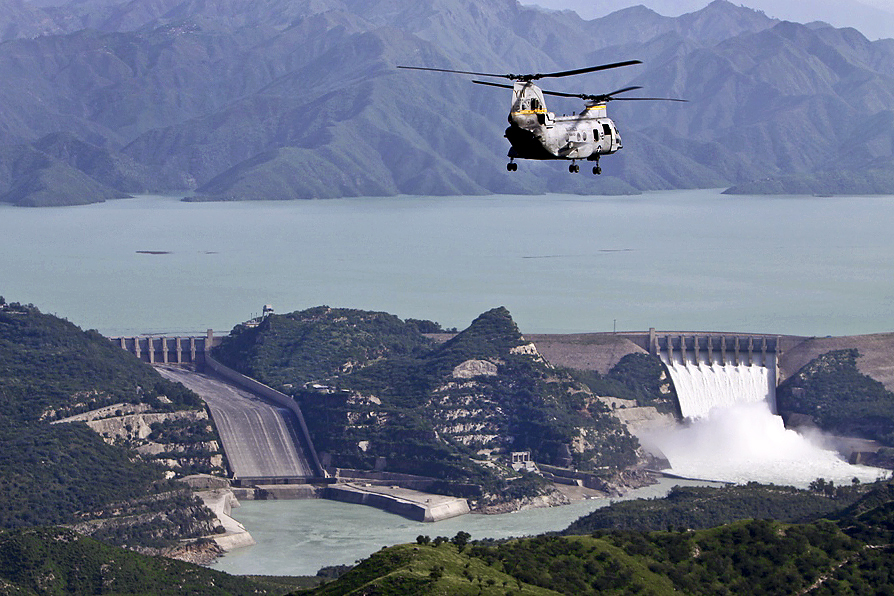
- Interactive map of Tarbela Lake
- Country: Pakistan
- Region: Khyber Pakhtunkhwa
- Time zone: UTC+5 (PST)

Tarbela lake is a reservoir formed by the Tarbela Dam, located 3 km south of Haripur, in the Khyber Pakhtunkhwa province in Pakistan. It is one of the biggest lakes of Pakistan.

During the wet season the target high water level of 473 m AMSL is reached and often water has to be discharged over the spillways of the dam. At the end of winter low water levels are reached and some otherwise sunken attractions appear. The minimal water level is 396 meter.

== Recreation ==
Being one of the biggest lakes of Pakistan, Tarbela Lake is a popular tourist spot and recreation site in Pakistan.

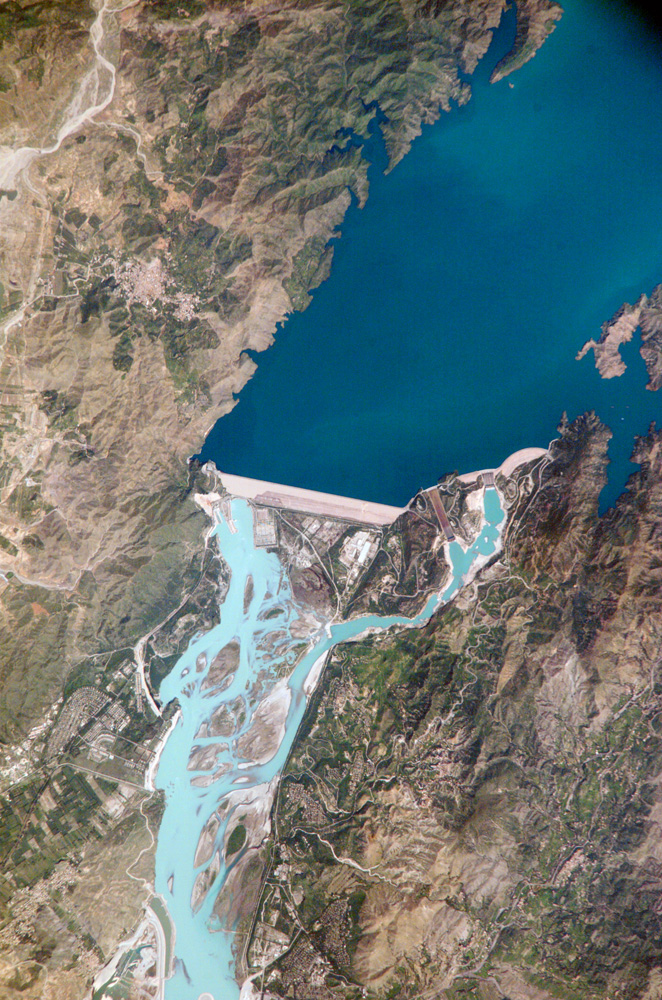
The lake was formed as a reservoir of the Tarbela Dam
