= Ghulam Ishaq Khan Institute of Engineering Sciences and Technology =

University in Pakistan

- غلام اسحاق خان انسٹیٹیوٹ
- Other name: GIK/GIKI
- Motto: رَبِّ زدْنيِ عِلْماً
- Motto in English: O my Lord! Increase me in Knowledge
- Type: Private
- Established: 1993
- Accreditation: HEC, PEC, WA
- Chancellor: President of Pakistan
- Rector: Fazal Ahmad Khalid
- Students: 2000
- Location: Topi, Khyber Pakhtunkhwa-23460, Pakistan; 34.0687°N 72.6449°E
- Colours: Space cadet, Maroon, Beige
- Website: www.giki.edu.pk

The Ghulam Ishaq Khan Institute of Engineering Sciences and Technology (Urdu: غلام اسحاق خان انسٹیٹیوٹ; Pashto: د غلام اسحاق خان د انجینرۍ علومو او ټکنالوژۍ انسټیټوټ; commonly referred as GIKI) is a private research university located in Topi, Khyber Pakhtunkhwa, in Pakistan. The institute has a 400-acre (1.6 km^{2}) campus that is located in the vicinity of Swabi District.

It was founded by the former President of Pakistan, Ghulam Ishaq Khan, in 1993.

GIK is one of the top institutions ranked by the Higher Education Commission (HEC).

== History ==
The GIK Institute is a private educational institution, named after former bureaucrat and former President of Pakistan Ghulam Ishaq Khan. The project was delegated to Pakistani scientist, Dr. Abdul Qadeer Khan, who was one of the founding members of the institute and was once registered as an associate professor of physics.

The genesis of the Institute can be traced back to the early 1950s when Ghulam Ishaq Khan became acutely aware of Pakistan's dependence on foreign expertise and imported technology. Out of his frequent interaction with the foreign and local experts emerged the idea that a centre of excellence in engineering sciences and production technology ought to be established in the country, whose standards of education are comparable to those of its counterparts in the advanced countries. The transformation of this idea into a practical proposition took place in December 1985 when the Benevolent Community Care and Infaq Foundation donated Rs. 50 million for setting up an institute in Khyber Pakhtunkhwa for promotion of science and technology.

Major founding donors include Nouman Benevolent Community Care, Infaq Foundation, Chiniot Anjuman-e-Islamia, Dawood Group of Industries, and the Government of Khyber-Pakhtunkhwa which has donated land at Topi.

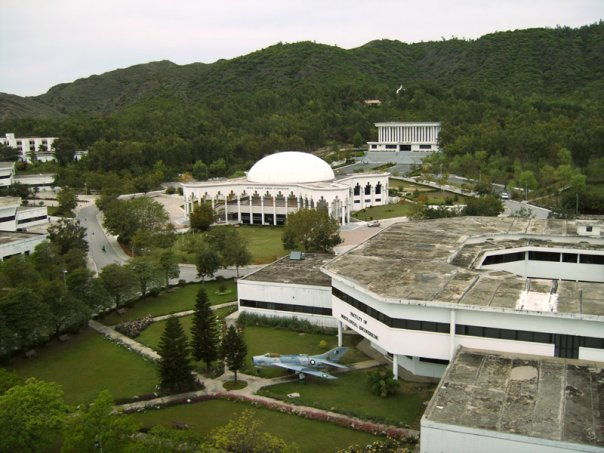
Ghulam Ishaq Khan Institute of Engineering Sciences and Technology

In June, 1988 its parent body, Society for the Promotion of Engineering Sciences and Technology in Pakistan (SOPREST) was established with Ghulam Ishaq Khan, then the president of the country being elected the president of the society for life.

The task of conceiving and formulating the basic form and features of the institute was entrusted to a group of eminent scientists and engineers. The civil works at the campus site were started in early 1990. An interim office of the institute was set up in August 1992 where senior professionals with notable backgrounds worked in a cohesive group to evolve the educational aims and philosophy of the institute, its curricula and details of the equipment for its laboratories and workshops.

In March 1993, the Government of Khyber-Pakhtunkhwa established the institute under the umbrella of SOPREST, and the first batch of students was inducted the same year in October.

The institute is the first privately funded institute of its kind in the country. The tuition fee has to be in consonance with the high cost of education. However, what the students are charged hardly covers the annual expenditure. Total capital outlay of the institute to-date on historical cost basis works out to more than Rs. 2.5 billion for which funds were mobilised from diverse sources including a major donation of Rs. 750 million from Infaq Foundation and land measuring 216 acres (87 ha) donated by the Government of Khyber Pakhtunkhwa.

In 1998, the Clinton Administration sanctioned the GIKI for alleged unspecified involvement in nuclear or missile activities.

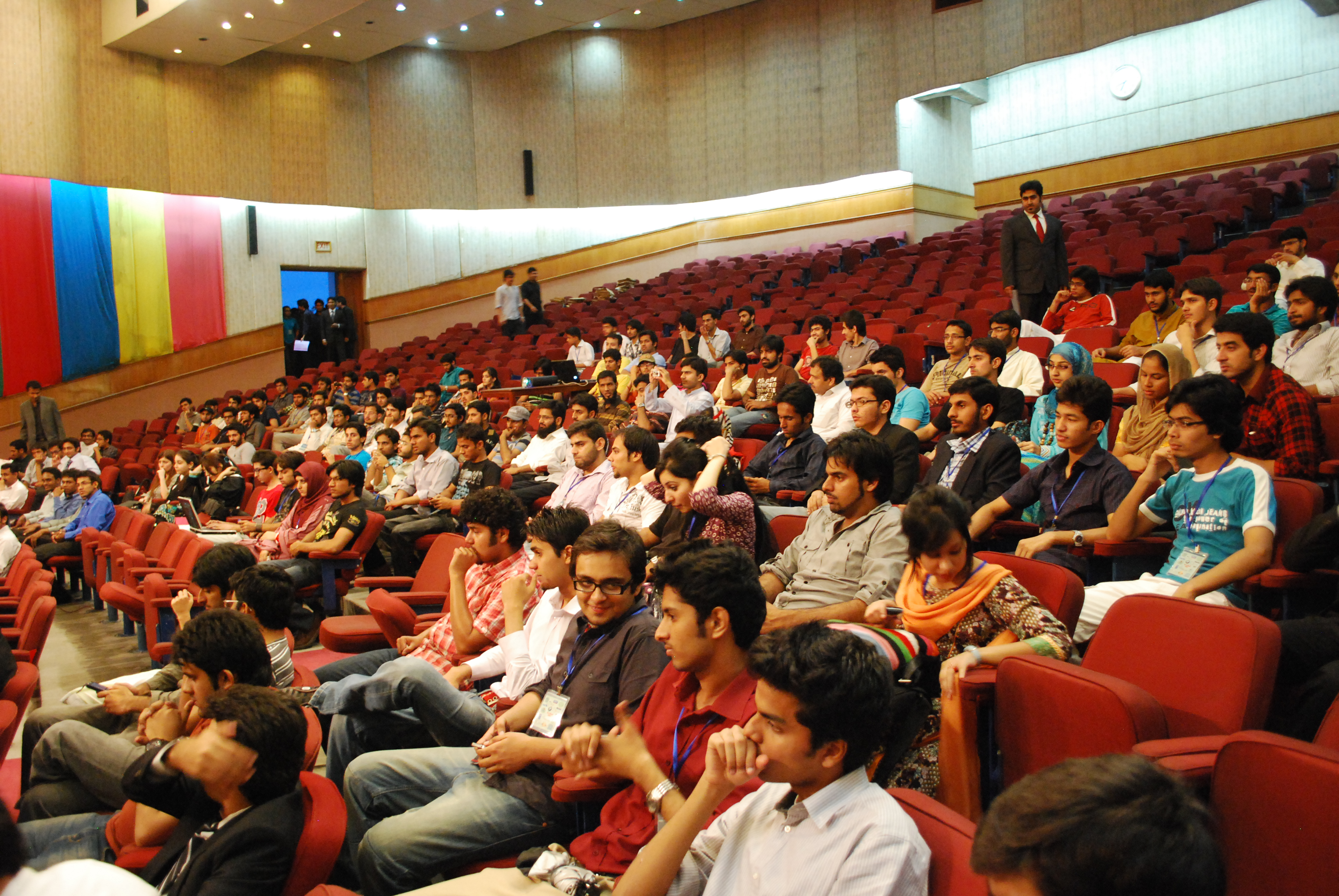
The Agha Hasan Abedi (AHA) Auditorium is named after Agha Hasan Abedi.

== Campus ==
The institute has a 400-acre (1.6 km^{2}) campus that is located in the vicinity of Swabi District.

=== Location ===
The university is situated beside the river Indus in the mountains of Tarbela and Gadoon-Amazai, in Khyber Pakhtunkhwa near the town of Topi and in proximity to the lakes of Tarbela Dam and Ghazi.

=== Landmarks ===
==== Clock tower ====
Clock Tower
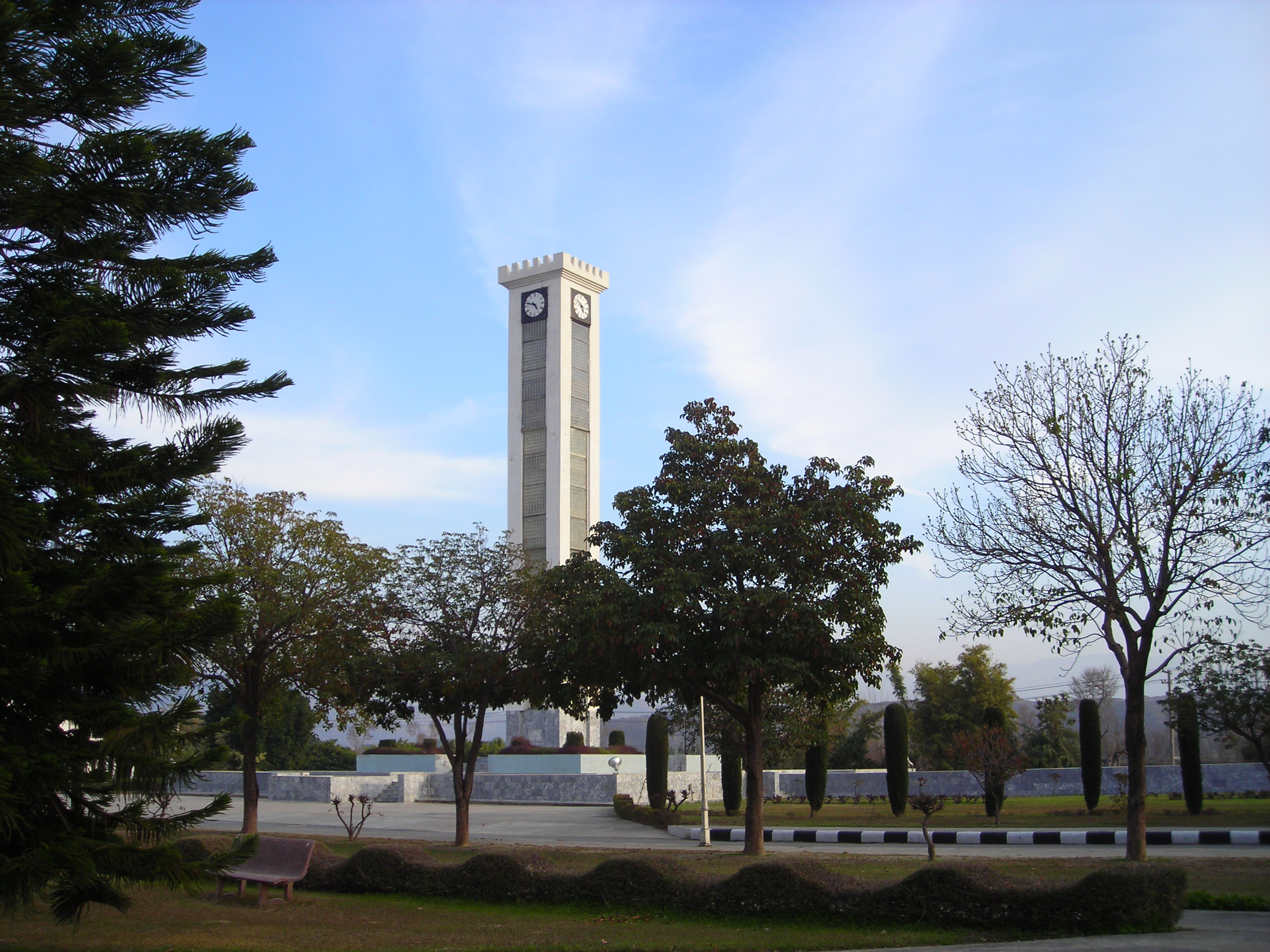
- GIK Institute Clock Tower

General information
- Type: Time, Monument, other
- Coordinates: 34.0687°N 72.6449°E
- Completed: 1995 (est.)

Clock Tower is a landmark of Ghulam Ishaq Khan, aka LoGIK in short. The clock tower can be seen from almost everywhere in the institute and has clocks on all four of its sides. It is the tallest structure in the area visible for many miles, and it provides a view of Tarbela Dam and the surrounding areas of Topi. It unites the institute on one time, and the student community is particularly fond of it.

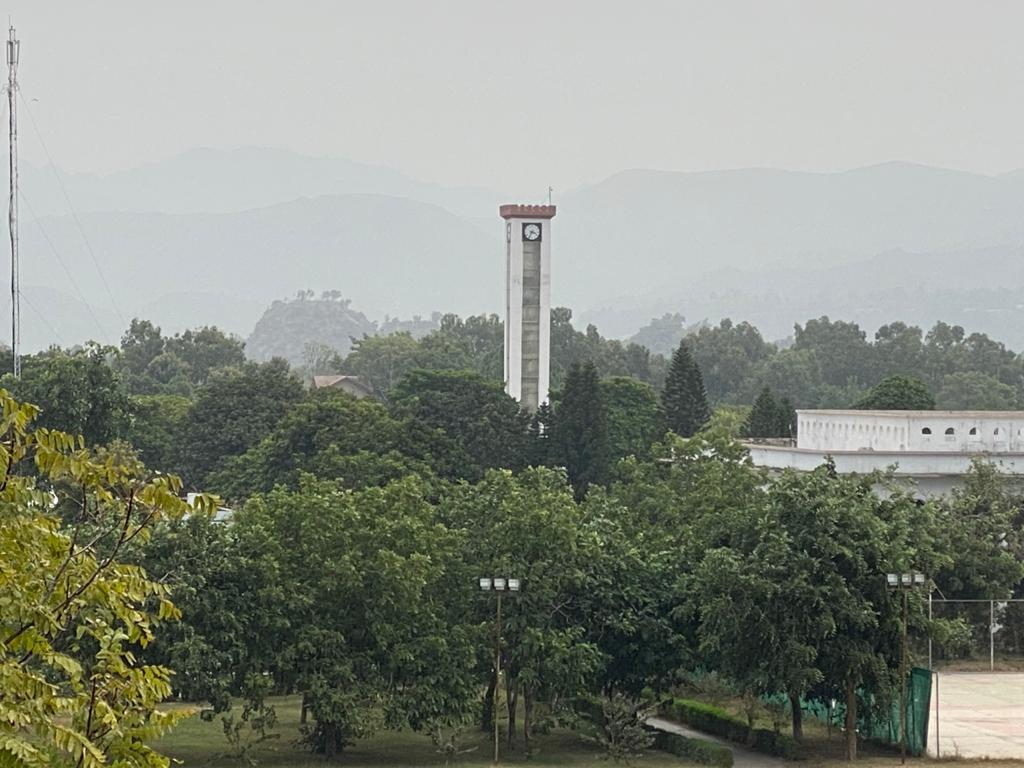
Landmark of Ghulam Ishaq Khan

==== Central Library ====
Initially, the library was housed in the Faculty of Metallurgy and Material Engineering (now Faculty of Material Science and Engineering). The construction of the main library building was started and completed in 1996. It is a stately three-story building, situated at the foothill of hills near Tarbela Dam.

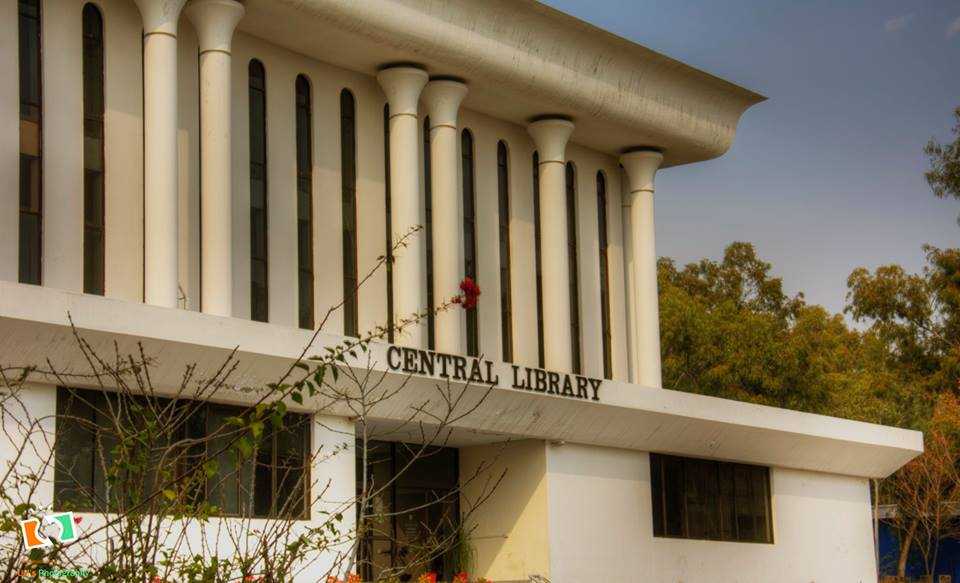
Central Library

==== Agha Hasan Abedi Auditorium ====
The Agha Hasan Abedi (AHA) Auditorium is named after Agha Hasan Abedi. It occupies the central place in the campus. It has a seating capacity of 535, and is a venue of conferences, seminars, debates, declamation contests, concerts, and other such functions.

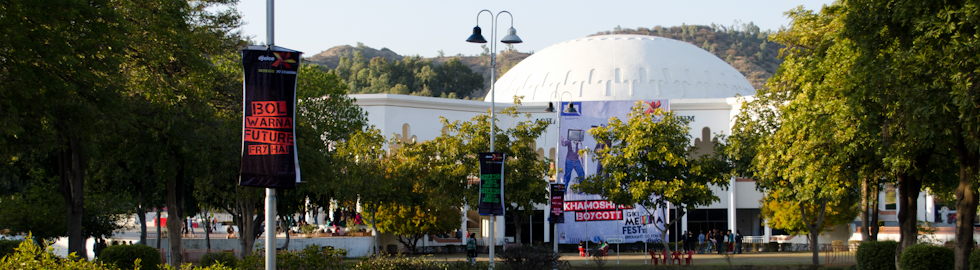
AHA Auditorium at Ghulam Ishaq Khan Institute of Engineering Sciences and Technology

== Rankings ==
The institute has been ranked number one in Pakistan and 30th internationally in Quality Education and has an overall ranking of 601–800th by The Times Higher Education in the World University Impact Rankings 2021.

The institute has been ranked third in the province of KPK, 22nd in Pakistan, 532nd Globally by UI Green Metric Rankings 2021.

The university was given a "Reporter" status on The Times Higher Education World University Rankings 2022 and Young University Rankings 2022.

== Faculties and Departments ==
=== Faculty of Engineering Sciences ===
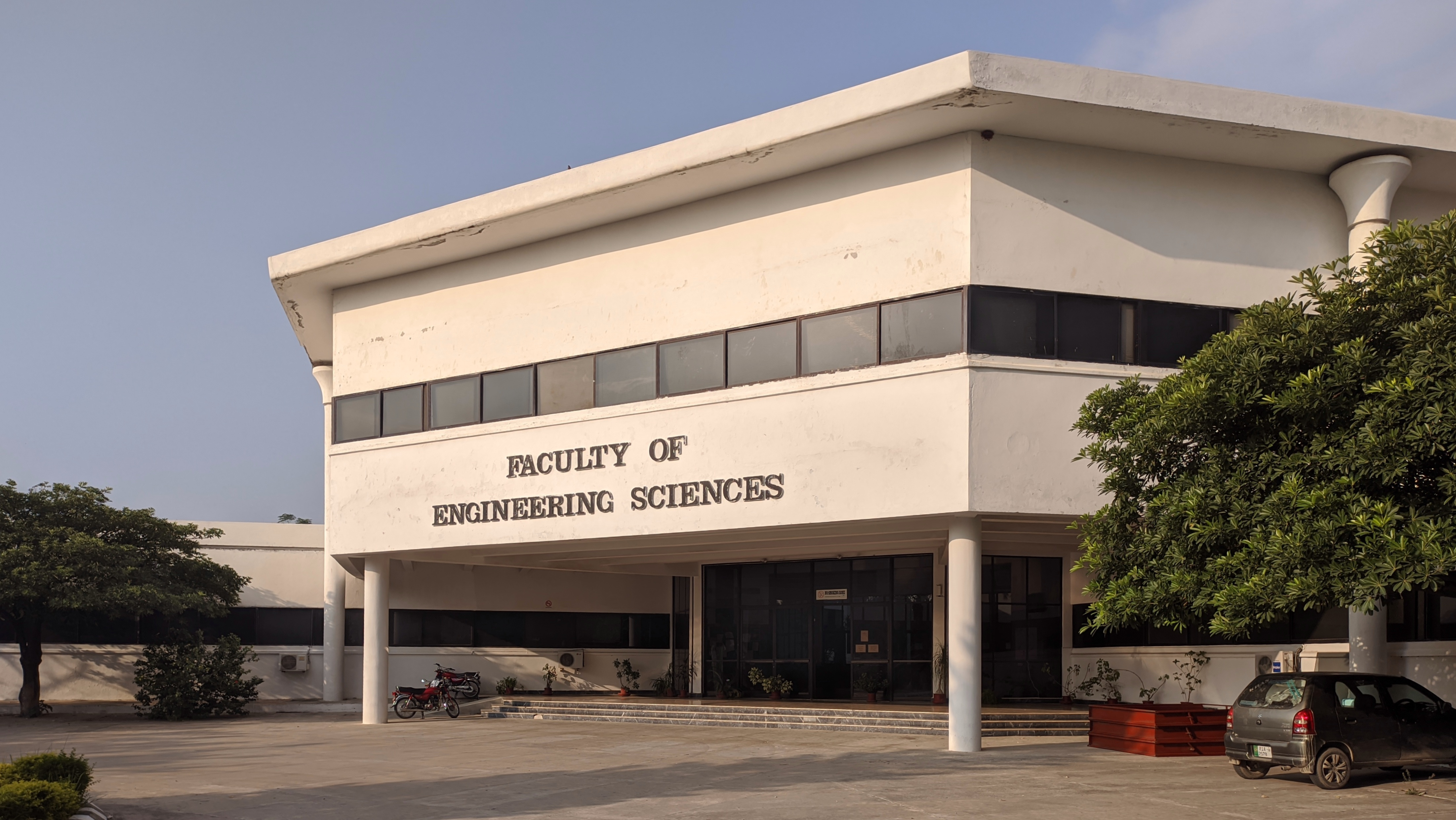
Faculty of Engineering Sciences building

The Faculty offers a 4-year Bachelor's in Engineering Sciences which encompasses some of the modern fields of engineering such as:

- Lasers and Electro-Optics
- Semiconductors and Superconducting Devices
- Modelling and Simulations

The faculty also offers MS and PhD degree programs in applied mathematics and applied physics.

=== Faculty of Computer Science and Electrical Engineering ===
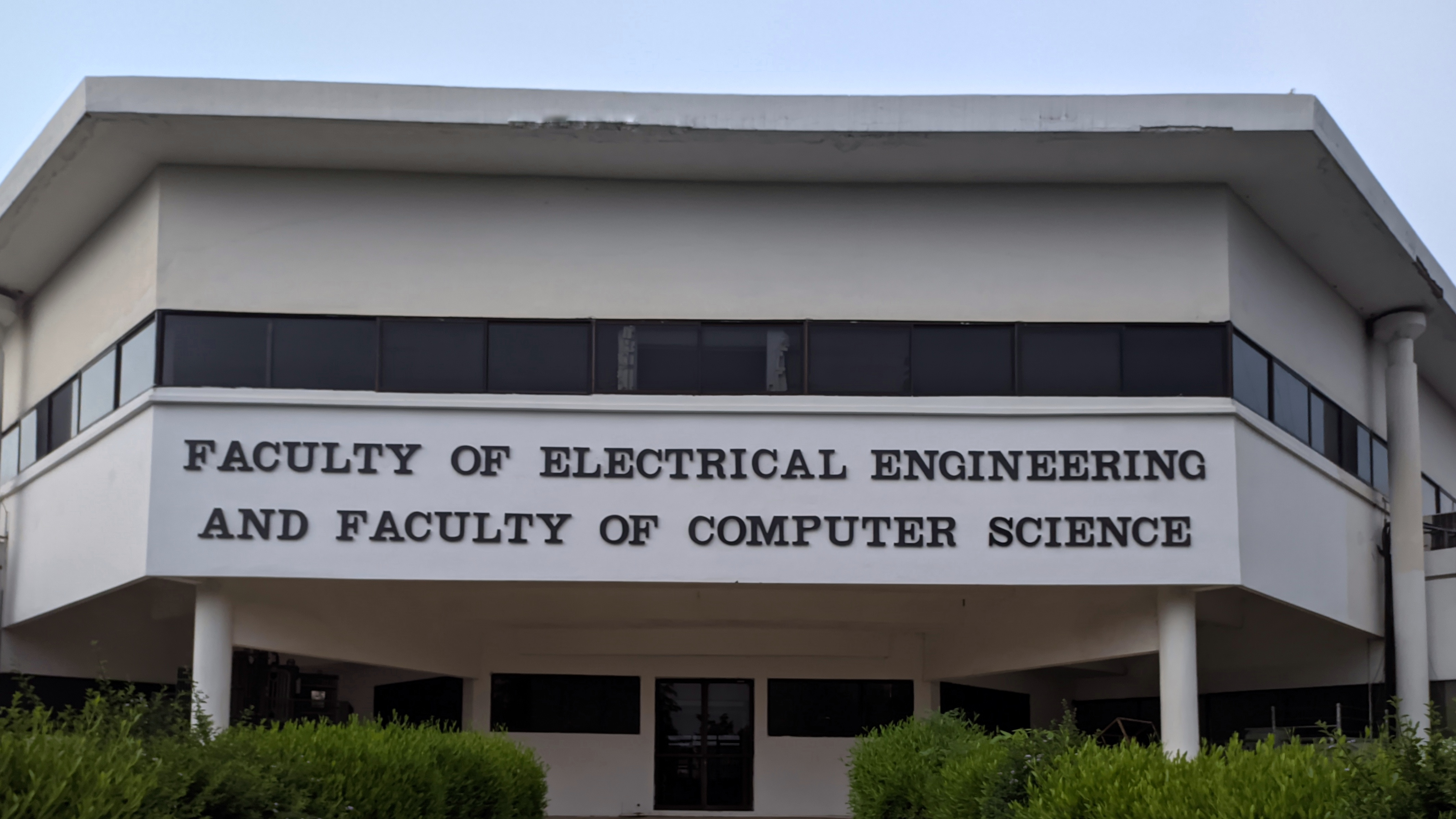
Faculty of Computer Science and Electrical Engineering building

Faculty of Electrical Engineering and Faculty of Computer Science and Engineering share the same department building.

==== Faculty of Electrical Engineering ====
It offers four year BS degree program in Electrical Engineering with following specializations:

- Electronic Engineering
- Power Engineering

Faculty Thrust Areas:

- Communication and Digital Signal Processing
- Microelectronics and ASIC Design
- Electric Power and Control Systems

==== Faculty of Computer Science and Engineering ====
The Faculty offers courses leading to Bachelor's (BS) in Computer Engineering, Artificial Intelligence, Data Science, and Computer Science. It also offers a Master's and a Ph.D. in Computer Systems Engineering.

On 6 July 2020, Ghulam Ishaq Khan Institute of Engineering Sciences and Technology, in collaboration with Huawei, launched its Bachelor of Science program in Artificial Intelligence.

The institute introduced its programs of Data Science in 2021 and Cyber Security in 2022.

=== Faculty of Mechanical Engineering ===
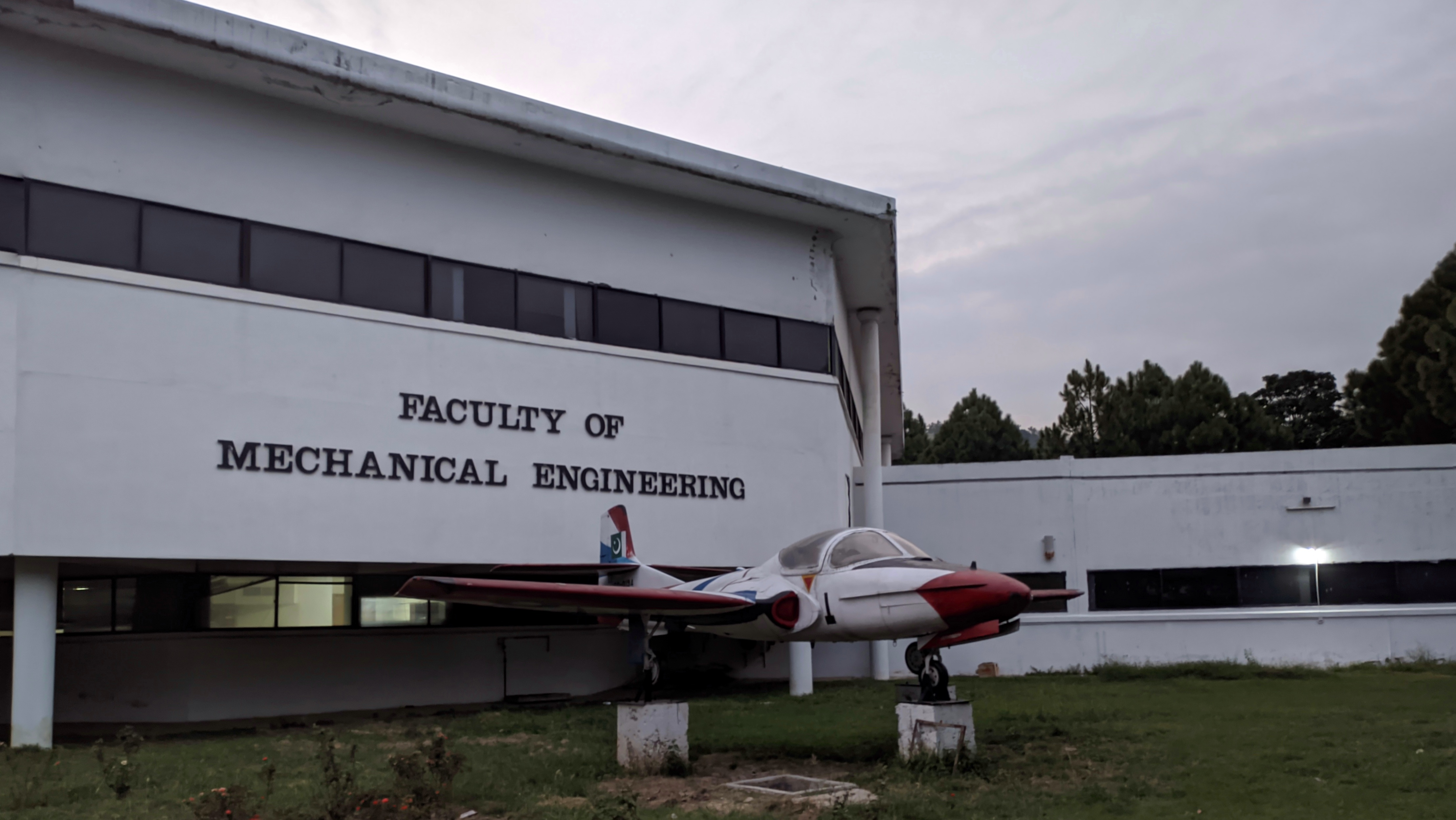
GIKI Faculty of Mechanical Engineering building

The Centre for Manufacturing Productivity and Technology Transfer (CMPT) is a multidisciplinary research / R&D Centre.

=== Faculty of Materials and Chemical Engineering ===
The Faculty offers two 4-year bachelor's degree programs:

- Materials Engineering
- Chemical Engineering

Materials Engineering program offers following specialization streams:

- Specialization in Manufacturing
- Specialization in Nanotechnology

=== Faculty of Civil Engineering ===
Ghulam Ishaq Khan Institute introduced its program of Civil Engineering in 2018. The department offers a four years BS Civil Engineering program.

=== Faculty of Management Sciences and Humanities ===
Degree program at undergraduate level had started from 2013. This Faculty offers 4 year BS Management Science degree with specialization in:

- Marketing & Entrepreneurship
- Accounting & Finance
- Supply Chain Management
- Project Management

=== International Advisory Board ===
The advisory board consists of scientists, engineers and academicians who are monitoring the institute's standard of education and research. It comprises faculty members from Kansas State University, Kyoto University, McGill University, University of Florida, University of Illinois at Urbana–Champaign and other institutions.

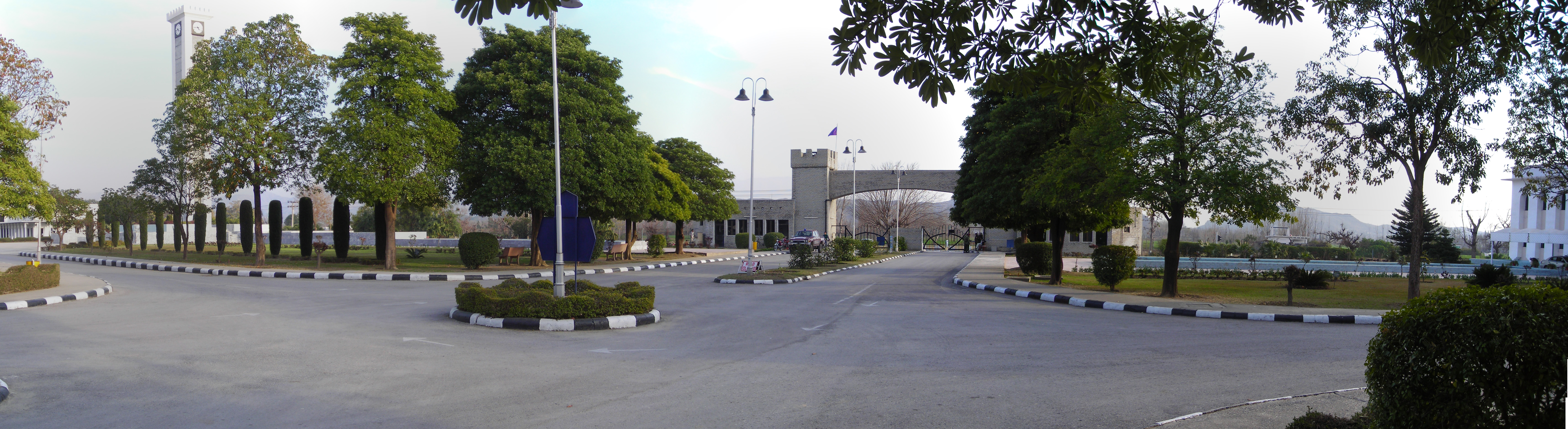
Main Entrance (from inside) – Credit: Hassan Zaheer

== Labs and facilities ==
=== High Performance Computing Cluster ===
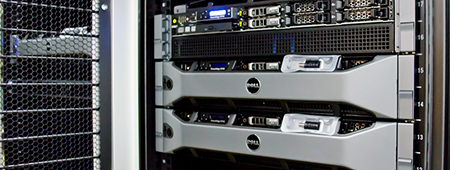
GIK Institute High Performance Computing Cluster

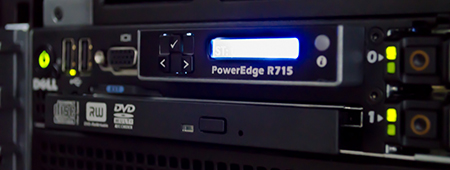
1359869414 DSC 5452

HPC platform has been donated to GIK Institute by the Directorate of Science and Technology (DoST) KPK Pakistan. It is a compute-intensive platform and has the following hardware components:

- Front Node: Dell R815 with 64 CPU cores, 256 GB RAM, 1.8 TB Secondary Memory
- 3 Compute Nodes: Dell R175 each with 32 CPU cores/ compute node (96 in total), 128 GB RAM/ compute node (384 GB in total), 600 GB Secondary Memory/ compute node (1.8 TB in total).
- NVIDIA Tesla M2090 Graphical.
- Dell Power Connect 8024F layer-3 manageable switch: Front Node and the Compute Nodes are connected to each other using this switch.

== Notable alumni ==
- Yarjan Abdul Samad, First Pakistani space scientist to work at University of Cambridge.
- Taimur Khan Jhagra, Provincial Minister of Finance for Khyber Pakhtunkhuwa and former Mckinsey Partner.
- Muhammad Hamza Shafqaat, former deputy commissioner Islamabad.
- Wardah Inam, cofounder and CEO of Overjet.
- Muhamad Adnan Butt, Pakistani entrepreneur

== Student life ==
=== Societies and clubs ===
The institute offers opportunities for students to participate in technical and professional societies. Study trips to industries and organizations are arranged, guest speakers from institutes and industries are invited and seminars and workshops are held. Sports facilities are available on the campus. Each faculty in the institute supports professional organizations, devoted to advancing the theory and practice of their fields. There are also societies that have been created for non-technical purposes and do not represent any particular faculty.

==== Popular societies ====
- ACM GIK Student Chapter
- AIAA – American Institute of Aeronautics and Astronautics
- AIESEC
- ASHRAE – American Society of Heat Refrigeration and Air Conditioning Engineer
- ASM/TMS – American Society for Materials or The Mineral, Metal & Material Society
- ASME – American Society of Mechanical Engineers
- CDES – Cultural Dramatics and Entertainment Society
- GIK Institute Consulting Group
- GSS – GIK Sports Society
- GMS – GIK Mathematics Society
- GSS – Graduate Students Society
- IET Institute of Engineering and Technology – GIK Students Chapter
- IEEE – GIK Student Branch
- IEEE – Women In Engineering (WIE)
- LDS – Literary and Debating Society
- LES – The Leadership and Entrepreneurship Society
- MediaClub
- NAQSH – Arts Society
- NETRONiX – Society of student administrators maintaining GIK's local area network
- Project Topi
- GSS – GIK Science Society
- Scribes – Writing Team
- SMEP – Society of Mechanical Engineers of Pakistan
- SOPHEP – Society for the Promotion of Higher Education Pakistan
- SPIE – Society for Photo-optical Instrumentation Engineers
- WES – Women Engineers Society

==== Technical Teams ====
- The GIK WebTeam – The team designs and maintains the institute's official website.
- Team Invictus – The only team that represents Pakistan in the international Design/Build/Fly Competition annually held in the United States.
- Team Hammerhead Arc
- Team Urban
- Formula GIK Team Infinity – GIK Institute's only team representing at the FSUK of IMechE held annually at Silverstone, United Kingdom.
- GIKI Rocket Engineering Team (GRET) represents Pakistan at Spaceport America Cup, an international intercollegiate rocketry competition annually held in New Mexico, US.
- Team Foxtrot – Team Specialized in building drones and Unmanned aerial vehicles(UAV's)
- Team Lambda – GIK Institute's Machine Learning and Data Science team.

=== Sports ===
The campus has its own sports facilities. Courts for indoor games and activities such as table tennis, badminton, and squash are available on the campus. Tennis, basketball and volleyball courts, football and cricket grounds are also present. The sports complex also features a swimming pool and gymnasium.

== See also ==
- List of engineering universities in Pakistan
- List of accidents and incidents involving military aircraft (2000–09)#2008 – for the aircraft crash at campus.
