= University of Haripur =

Public university in Pakistan

Coordinates: 33°58′41.4″N 72°54′45.7″E

The University of Haripur, KP
- جامعہ ہری پور
- Motto in English: Restoring Hope, Building Community
- Type: Public
- Established: 2012
- Affiliations: Higher Education Commission (Pakistan)
- Chancellor: Governor of Khyber Pakhtunkhwa
- Vice-Chancellor: Shafiq ur Rahman
- Location: Haripur, Khyber Pakhtunkhwa, Pakistan
- Nickname: UOH
- Website: uoh.edu.pk

The University of Haripur (UOH) (Urdu: جامعہ ہری پور) is a public university situated in Haripur, Khyber Pakhtunkhwa, Pakistan. UoH offers a wide range of undergraduate and graduate programs in various disciplines, including business administration, computer science and social sciences

== History ==
UOH was established in March 2008 as a Haripur campus of Hazara University. The campus was upgraded to full-fledged University of Haripur (UOH) in 2012 by the Government of Khyber Pakhtunkhwa.

== Faculties and departments ==
The university currently has the following departments and faculties. Department of Information Technology is one of the largest department of The University of Haripur with highest graduation rate. It also holds the largest number of students.

=== Faculty of Information Technology and Numerical Sciences ===
- Department of Information Technology
- Department of Mathematics
- Department of Physics
- Allied Section

=== Faculty of Social and Administrative Sciences ===
- Department of Economics
- Department of Education
- Department of Islamic and Religious Studies
- Department of Management Sciences
- Department of Psychology

=== Faculty of Basic and Applied Sciences ===
- Department of Information Technology
- Department of Agriculture Sciences
- Department of history & Education
- Department of Islamic and religious studies
- Department of Environmental Sciences
- Department of Forestry and Wildlife Management
- Department of Linguistics
- Department of Geology
- Department of Medical Lab Technology
- Department of Microbiology
- Department of Public Health
- Department of Agronomy
- Department of Entomology
- Department of Pure and Applied Mathematics
- Department of Food Science and Technology
- Allied Health Sciences

=== Faculty of Biological & Biomedical Sciences ===
- Department of Biology
- Department of MLT
- Department of Public Health
- Department of Microbiology

== Academic programs ==
UOH currently offers the following courses.

=== BS (4 years) ===
- BS Artificial intelligence
- BS Computer Science
- BS Software Engineering
- BS Data Science
- BS Telecom and networking
- BS Accounting and Finance
- BS Economics
- BS Environmental Science
- BS Education
- BS Psychology
- BS Medical Lab Technology (Diagnostic and Research Center)
- BS Geology
- BS Forestry and Wildlife
- BS Physics
- BS Chemistry
- BS Food Science
- BS health and physical education
- BS Biochemistry
- BS Botany
- BS Zoology
- BS Public Health
- BS English
- BS History
- BS Food Science and Technology
- BS Anesthesia Technology
- BS Radiology
- BS Dental Technology
- LAW

=== BS (5 years) ===
- Doctor of Physical Therapy (Launched in Fall-2022)

=== Doctor of Physical Therapy (DPT) ===
- The Doctor of Physical Therapy (DPT) program at the University of Haripur was initiated in Fall 2022 under the Department of MLT. The program is designed to prepare competent and ethically responsible physical therapy professionals with strong foundations in clinical practice, evidence-based research, and patient-centered care. The DPT curriculum follows the academic standards and framework prescribed by the Higher Education Commission (HEC) of Pakistan and the Allied Health professional council (AHPC). To enhance professional training, the University of Haripur has signed a Memorandum of Understanding (MoU) with the District Headquarters (DHQ) Hospital Haripur, providing students with opportunities for supervised clinical practice in real healthcare environments. The program emphasizes both theoretical instruction and practical training through laboratory sessions, clinical rotations, and community-based rehabilitation initiatives. The first Batch of DPT students successfully graduated in Spring 2027, marking a significant milestone in the university's commitment to advancing health sciences education in the region.

=== Masters (2 years) ===
- MBA
- MCS (Computer Science)
- MSc Economics
- MSc Environmental Sciences
- MSc Agriculture Sciences
- MEd (Education)
- MSc Psychology
- MSc Medical Lab Technology (Diagnostic and Research Center)
- MSc Microbiology
- MSc Public Health

MSC (FST)

=== MPhil and PhD ===
- MPhil and PhD (Environmental Sciences)
- MPhil and PhD (Microbiology)
- MPhil and PhD (information technology)
- PhD (Agricultural Sciences; i.e. Agronomy, Entomology, Food Science and Technology, Horticulture, Plant Breeding and Genetics (PBG), Soil and Environmental Sciences)
- MPhil and PhD (Education)
- MPhil (Forestry and Wild Life)
- MPhil (Islamic and Religious Studies)

== See also ==
- Hazara University
- Abbottabad University of Science and Technology
- Government Post Graduate College Haripur
