= Kundi, Haripur =

Kundi
- Town and union council
- Country: Pakistan
- Region: Khyber-Pakhtunkhwa
- District: Haripur
- Time zone: UTC+5 (PST)

Kundi is one of the 44 union councils, administrative subdivisions, of Haripur District in Khyber-Pakhtunkhwa province of Pakistan. This Union Council consists of Sher Awal, Kundi, Umar Khana, Gharhi Maira, Darra Mohat, Sobra city and the surrounding areas.
