= Ghazi Tehsil =

Coordinates: 34°00′N 72°39′E

Ghazi Tehsil تحصیل غازی
- Tehsil
- Interactive map of Ghazi Tehsil
- Country: Pakistan
- Province: Khyber Pakhtunkhwa
- District: Haripur

Government
  - Chairman: Syed Muhammad Qasim Shah (PML(N))

Population (2017)
  - Total: 145,367
- Time zone: UTC+5 (PST)
- Number of towns: 1
- Number of Union Councils: 8

Ghazi Tehsil is a tehsil located in Haripur District, Khyber Pakhtunkhwa, Pakistan. The tehsil, headquartered at the town of Ghazi, is itself subdivided into 8 Union Councils.
