= Kundi, Uttar Pradesh =

Kundi is a village situated in Sarsawa block, Saharanpur district of Uttar Pradesh state, India. It is about 21.5 km from Saharanpur city and 30 km from Yamunanagar city.
