= Tarbela =

- Town and union council
- Interactive map of Tarbela
- Coordinates: 34°8′0″N 72°49′0″E
- Country: Pakistan
- Region: Khyber Pakhtunkhwa
- District: Haripur District
- Time zone: UTC+5 (PST)

Tarbela (Punjabi: تربیلا) or Torbela (Pashto: توربېلا) is one of the 44 union councils, administrative subdivisions, of Haripur District in the Khyber Pakhtunkhwa province of Pakistan. The name comes from the words tor (Pashto for "black") and bela (Punjabi/Hindko for "forest").

Khalabat township is divided into four sectors: Sectors 1 and 2 are called Tarbela union; sectors 3 and 4 are called Khalabat union council.

Nearby Tarbela Dam got its name from this Tarbela.

== Festival ==
On 1st Baisakh (April 11), the Hindu residents in the vicinity and of the Hazara plain bathed in the Indus River. The assembly is religious and lasts for two days.
