= Ghazi, Haripur =

Ghazi غازی
- Town and union council
- Location in Pakistan Ghazi (Pakistan)
- Coordinates: 34°01′05″N 72°39′04″E
- Country: Pakistan
- Region: Khyber Pakhtunkhwa
- District: Haripur District
- Time zone: UTC+5 (PST)

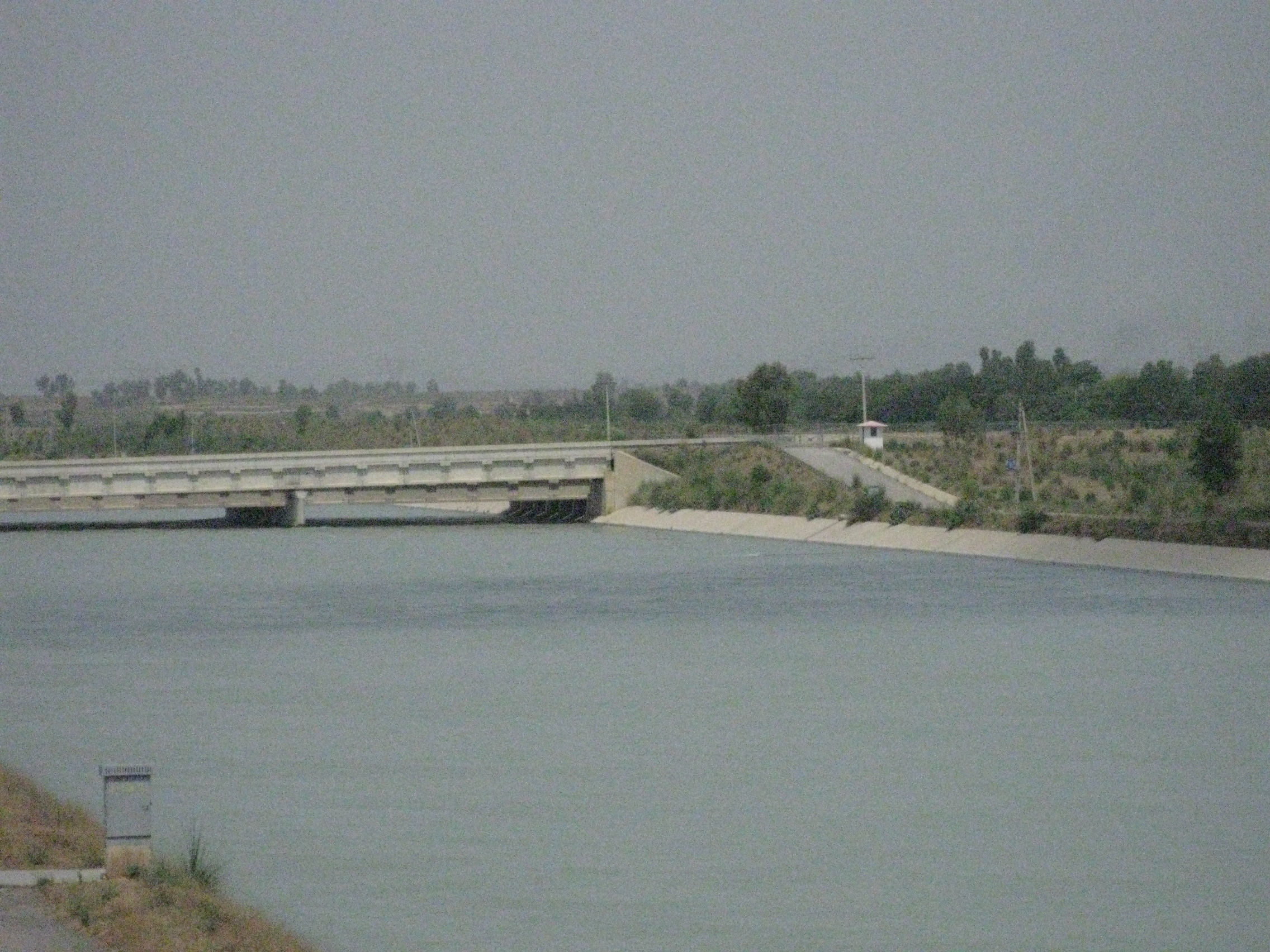
Ghazi Barotha Canal

Ghazi (Urdu: غازی) is an administrative subdivision of Haripur District in Khyber Pakhtunkhwa province of Pakistan. Assistant Commissioner of Ghazi is Fizza Mohsin. She started her service on 24 February 2022.

Some of the villages located in Ghazi's midst are:

- Bhai
- Bharwasa
- Hassanpur
- Isa
- Gahara*
- Jammun
- Jalu
- Khairbara
- Khalo
- Kohtehra
- Pipliala
- Salam Khand
- Sobra
