= Haripur, Pakistan =

City in Khyber Pakhtunkhwa, Pakistan

Haripur ہری پور
- City
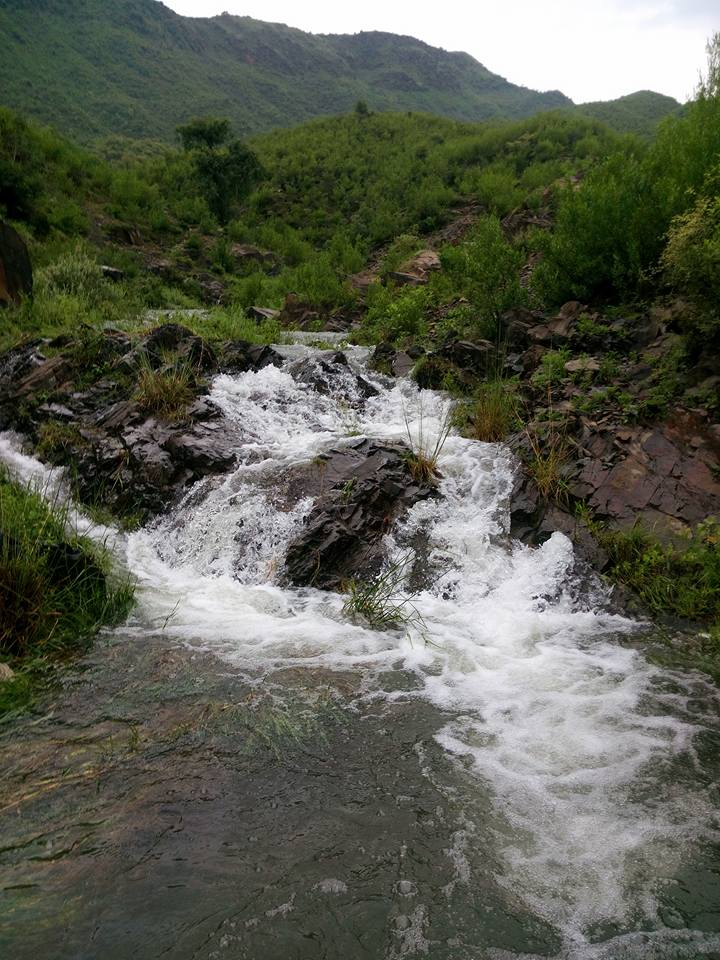
- Small Waterfall in Haripur City

- Location of Haripur Haripur (Pakistan) Haripur (South Asia) Haripur (Asia)
- Coordinates: 33°59′39″N 72°56′0″E
- Country: Pakistan
- Province: Khyber Pakhtunkhwa
- District: Haripur

Government
  - Type: Tehsil Municipal Administration
- Elevation: 520 m (1,710 ft)

Population (2023)
  - City: 91,915
  - Rank: 140th in Pakistan
- Time zone: UTC+5 (PST)
- Calling code: 0995
- Number of Union councils: 45

Haripur (Hindko, Urdu: ہری پور) is a city in the Hazara Division of Khyber Pakhtunkhwa province, Pakistan. It is the 14th most populous city in the province, and serves as the headquarter of its namesake tehsil and district. Located some 65 km (40 mi) north of Islamabad Capital Territory and 35 km (22 mi) south of Abbottabad, Haripur is in a hilly plain area at an altitude of 520 m (1,706 ft).

== History ==
Boundaries of Haripur

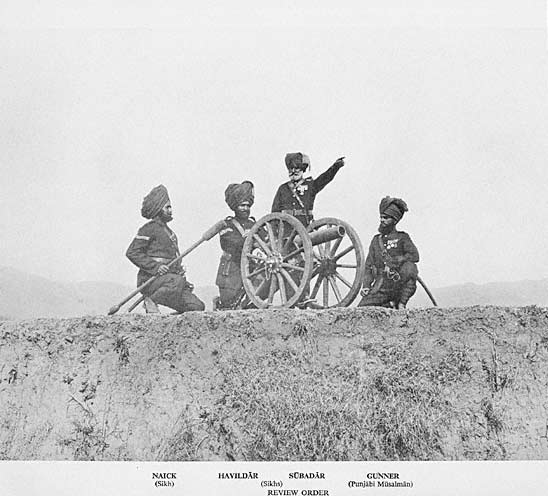
The 4th Hazara Mountain Battery

Haripur was founded by Hari Singh Nalwa, a Punjabi Sikh commander of Ranjit Singh, in 1822 and became the headquarters of Hazara until 1848. Hari Singh Nalwa had been appointed as the Nazim of Hazara after the first Nazim Amar Singh Majithia was killed by the local populace at Samundar Katha, Abbottabad. The town was visited by Baron Hugel on 23 December 1835, and he found it humming with activity.

The British East India Company conquered Haripur after the defeat of the Sikhs in the first Anglo-Sikh War in 1846. An obelisk marks the grave of Colonel Canara, a European officer of the Sikh Artillery, who fell in 1848 defending his guns single-handed against the insurgents under Chattar Singh. The British divided Hazara region into three tehsils (administrative subdivisions): Mansehra, Abbottabad, and Haripur. Hazara formed part of Punjab province until 1901, when the British formed the buffer province of North West Frontier Province (NWFP) and Hazara was annexed into it. During the British rule, Haripur was a small town. Its population according to the 1901 census was 5,578 and the income and expenditure during the ten years ending 1902–3 averaged Rs. 17,800. In 1903–04 the income and expenditure were Rs. 19,100 and Rs. 20,000 respectively. The municipality was constituted in 1867.

In 1851, the 4th (Hazara) Mountain Battery was raised at Haripur by local Hazarewal gunners, who were trained by James Abbott, a British officer and first deputy commissioner of Hazara, to defend the district. The Hazarewals embarked on many campaigns throughout the province.

After the independence, Hazara district was elevated to the divisional status in 1976. After some time Haripur Tehsil was made district and Haripur became its headquarters.

== Education ==
Haripur has the University of Haripur with some colleges affiliated with it, as well as the Pak-Austria Fachhochschule: Institute of Applied Sciences and Technology.

== Demographics ==
=== Population ===
Historical population

Year	Pop.	±%
1951	7,979	—
1961	10,217	+28.0%
1972	25,245	+147.1%
1981	31,117	+23.3%

Year	Pop.	±%
1998	48,309	+55.2%
2017	85,739	+77.5%
2023	91,915	+7.2%

As of the 2023 census, Haripur had a population of 91,915.

Languages

Languages of Haripur city (2023 Census)
1. Hindko (79.3%)
2. Pashto (10.9%)
3. Urdu (6.40%)
4. Punjabi (2.40%)
5. Others (1.00%)

=== Religion ===
Religious groups in Haripur City (1881−2017) (Note: 1881-1941: Data for the entirety of the town of Haripur, which included Haripur Municipality.)
Religious group	1881		1901		1911		1921		1931		1941		2017	
Religious group	Pop.	%	Pop.	%	Pop.	%	Pop.	%	Pop.	%	Pop.	%	Pop.	%
Islam	2,461	50.39%	2,978	53.39%	3,515	56.76%	2,907	49.36%	4,253	55.57%	5,174	55.5%	132,930	99.87%
Hinduism (Note: 1931-1941: Including Ad-Dharmis)	2,378	48.69%	1,666	29.87%	2,250	36.33%	2,636	44.76%	2,693	35.19%	3,113	33.39%	5	0%
Sikhism	45	0.92%	933	16.73%	423	6.83%	346	5.88%	696	9.09%	1,035	11.1%	—N/a	—N/a
Jainism	0	0%	0	0%	0	0%	0	0%	0	0%	—N/a	—N/a	—N/a	—N/a
Christianity	—N/a	—N/a	1	0.02%	5	0.08%	0	0%	11	0.14%	0	0%	65	0.05%
Zoroastrianism	—N/a	—N/a	0	0%	0	0%	0	0%	0	0%	0	0%	—N/a	—N/a
Judaism	—N/a	—N/a	0	0%	0	0%	0	0%	0	0%	0	0%	—N/a	—N/a
Buddhism	—N/a	—N/a	0	0%	0	0%	0	0%	0	0%	—N/a	—N/a	—N/a	—N/a
Ahmadiyya	—N/a	—N/a	—N/a	—N/a	—N/a	—N/a	—N/a	—N/a	—N/a	—N/a	—N/a	—N/a	50	0.04%
Others	0	0%	0	0%	0	0%	0	0%	0	0%	0	0%	50	0.04%
Total population	4,884	100%	5,578	100%	6,193	100%	5,889	100%	7,653	100%	9,322	100%	133,100	100%

== Climate ==
The weather in Haripur is characterized by relatively high temperatures and evenly distributed precipitation throughout the year. This climate type is found on the eastern sides of the continents between 20° and 35° N and S latitudes. The Köppen climate classification subtype for this climate is "Cfa" (humid subtropical climate).

Climate data for Haripur, Pakistan
Month	Jan	Feb	Mar	Apr	May	Jun	Jul	Aug	Sep	Oct	Nov	Dec	Year
Mean daily maximum °C (°F)	17 (62)	18 (64)	23 (73)	28 (82)	34 (93)	39 (102)	37 (98)	34 (93)	33 (91)	30 (86)	24 (75)	19 (66)	28 (82)
Mean daily minimum °C (°F)	3 (37)	5 (41)	10 (50)	14 (57)	18 (64)	24 (75)	24 (75)	23 (73)	20 (68)	14 (57)	9 (48)	4 (39)	14 (57)
Average precipitation mm (inches)	74 (2.9)	100 (4.1)	120 (4.9)	100 (4.1)	74 (2.9)	76 (3)	250 (9.7)	240 (9.6)	97 (3.8)	51 (2)	30 (1.2)	48 (1.9)	1,260 (50.1)
Source: Weatherbase

== Notable personalities ==
- Ayub Khan, former President of Pakistan
- Qateel Shifai, Urdu poet and lyricist
- Allama Syed Jawad Naqvi – Islamic revolutionary scholar and religious leader.
- Sohail Akhtar, Pakistani cricketer
- Omar Ayub Khan, politician
- Raja Sikander Zaman, former Chief Minister
- Anwar Shamim, Air Marshal.
- Pir Sabir Shah, former Chief Minister
- Athar Minallah, Supreme Court Judge

== See also ==
- Hazara, Pakistan
- State of Amb
