= Haripur District =

Districts in Pakistan

Haripur District ضلع ہری پور
- District of Khyber Pakhtunkhwa
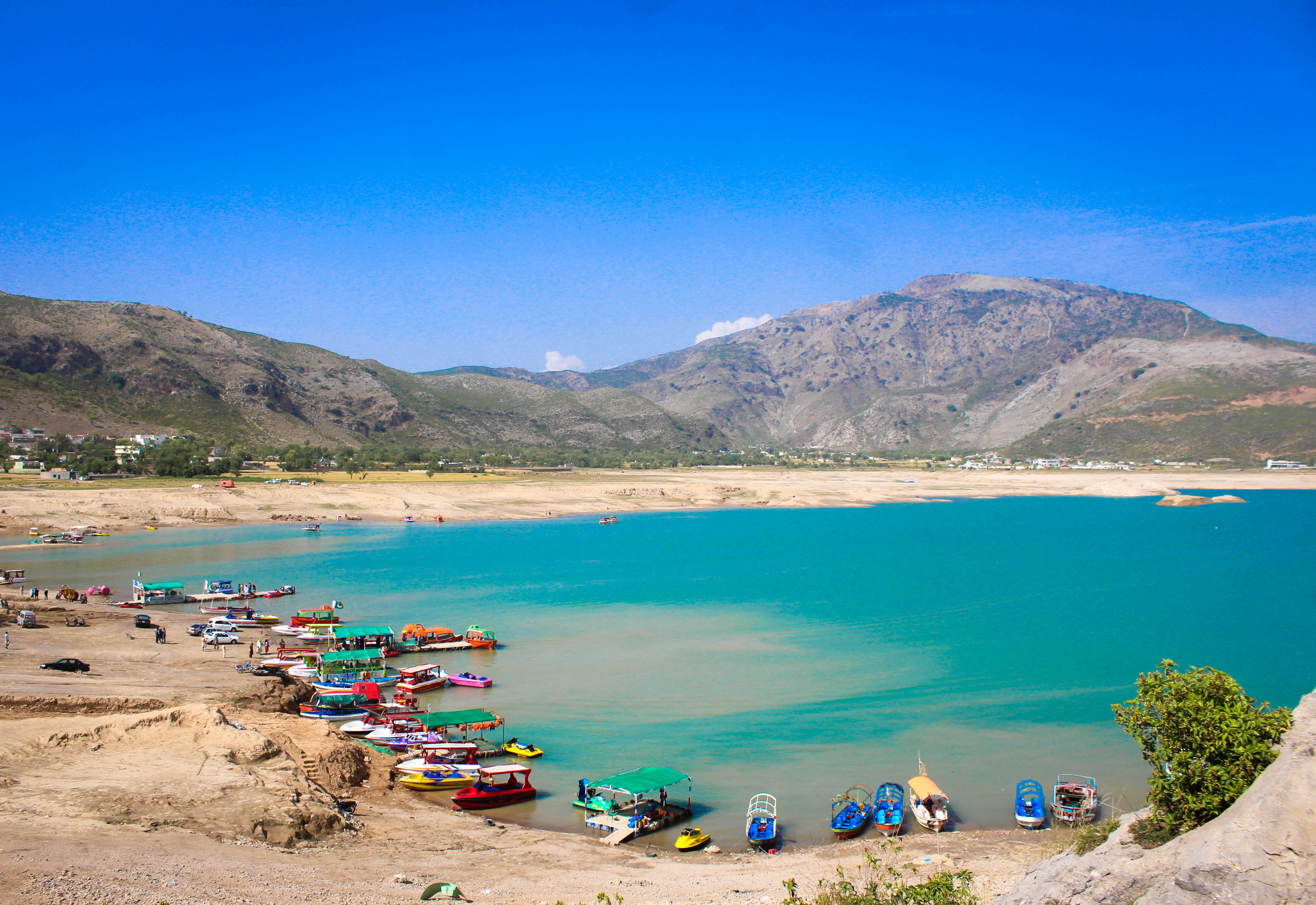
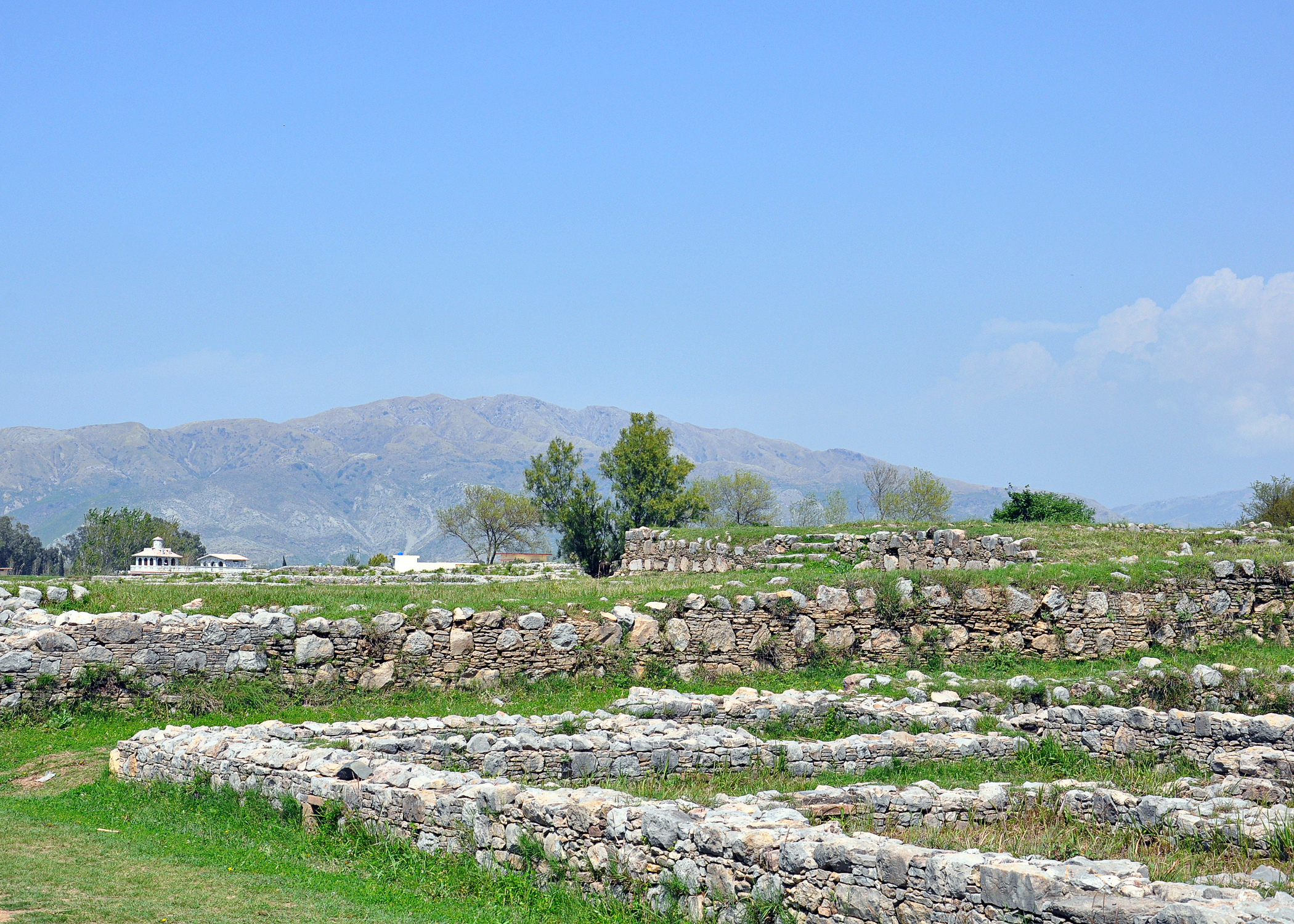
- Top: Khanpur Dam; Bottom: Buddhist remains at Badalpur

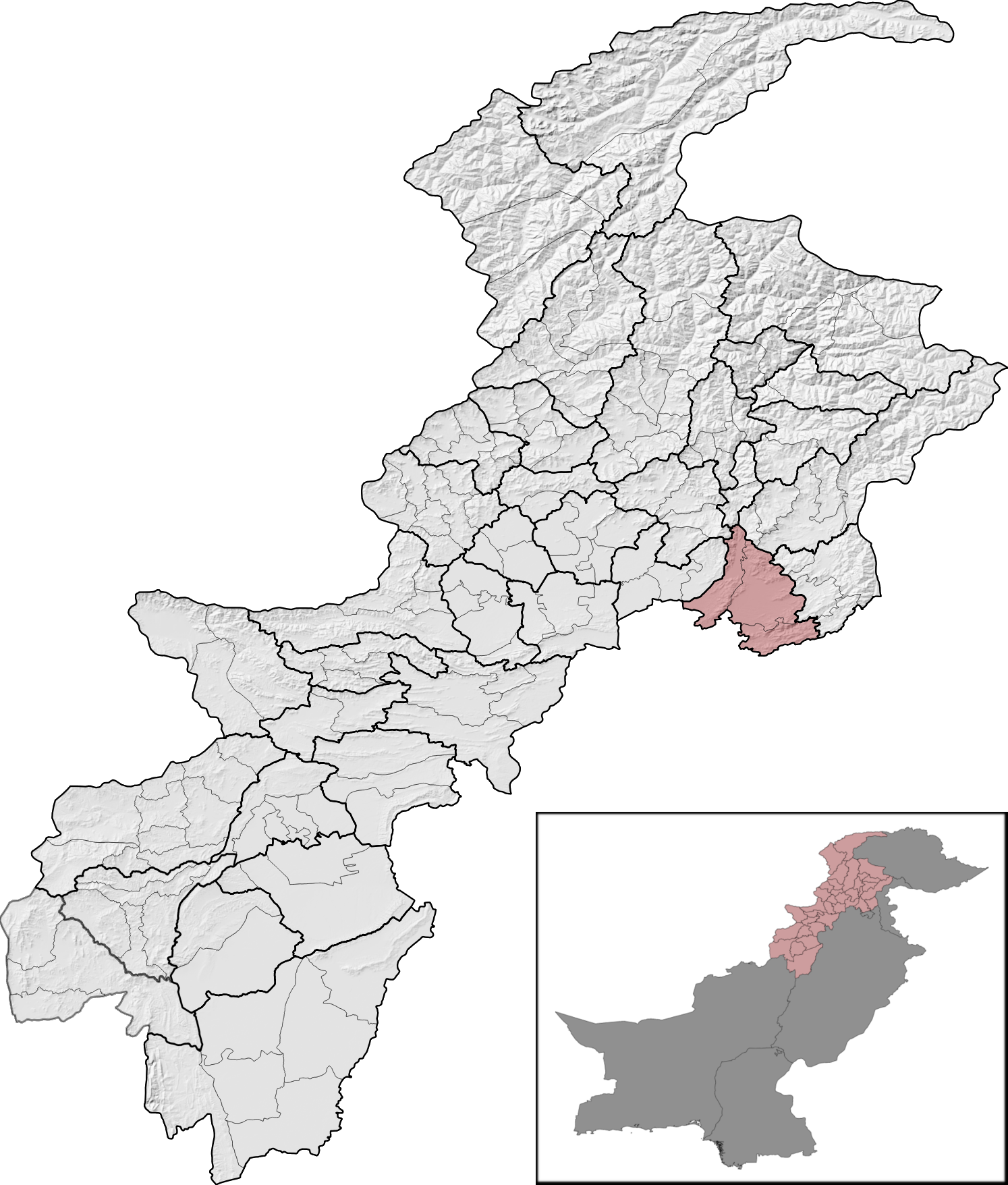
- Haripur District (red) in Khyber Pakhtunkhwa
- Country: Pakistan
- Province: Khyber Pakhtunkhwa
- Division: Hazara
- Established: 1991; 35 years ago
- Preceded: Abbottabad District (1976-1991)
- Headquarters: Haripur
- Administrative Tehsils: 03: Ghazi Tehsil Haripur Tehsil Khanpur Tehsil

Government
  - Type: District Administration
  - Deputy Commissioner: Shauzab Abbas
  - Constituensy: NA-18 Haripur

Area
  - District of Khyber Pakhtunkhwa: 1,725 km^{2} (666 sq mi)
- Elevation: 691 m (2,267 ft)
- Highest elevation: 1,711 m (5,614 ft)
- Lowest elevation: 416 m (1,365 ft)

Population (2023)
  - District of Khyber Pakhtunkhwa: 1,173,056
  - Density: 680.0/km^{2} (1,761/sq mi)
  - Urban: 147,765
  - Rural: 1,027,018

Literacy
  - Literacy rate: Total: (74.88%); Male: (84.13%); Female: (65.61%)
- Time zone: UTC+05:00 (PKT)
  - Summer (DST): DST is not observed
- ZIP Code: 02262
- NWD (area) code: 0995
- ISO 3166 code: PK-KP
- CNIC Code of Haripur District: 1330X-XXXXXXX-X
- Website: haripur.kp.gov.pk

Haripur District (Hindko, Urdu: ضلع ہری پور) is a district in the Hazara Division of Khyber Pakhtunkhwa, Pakistan. Before obtaining the status of a district in 1991, Haripur was a tehsil of Abbottabad District Its headquarters are the city of Haripur. According to 2023 Pakistani census population of Haripur District is 1,173,056 (1.1 million).

== History ==
During British rule what now constitutes Haripur district was an administrative subdivision (tehsil) of Hazara District.

The tehsil was described by the Imperial Gazetteer of India, compiled over a century ago during British rule as follows:

Tahsil of Hazāra District, North-West Frontier, lying between 33° 44′ and 34° 18′ N. and 72° 33′ and 73° 14′ E., with an area of 657 square miles. It is bounded on the north-west by the Indus. The tahsil consists of a sloping plain, from 1,500 to 3,000 feet high, through which the Siran and Harroh flow. Low hills are dotted here and there over the plain. The population in 1901 was 151,638, compared with 142,856 in 1891. It contains the town of HARIPUR (population, 5,578), the head-quarters; and 311 villages. The land revenue and cesses in 1903-4 amounted to Rs. 1,72,000".

On 30 June 1976, the Pakistani government bifurcated Hazara District, Mansehra Tehsil became a district in its own right and the two remaining tehsils Abbottabad and Haripur formed the district of Abbottabad.

In 1991 the tehsil of Haripur was split off from Abbottabad to form Haripur District.

== Geography ==
Boundaries of Haripur

The district of Haripur borders Abbottabad District to the east, Mansehra District to the northeast, the Punjab to the southeast, Buner to the northwest, and Swabi to the west. The federal capital of Islamabad is adjacent to the district in the south.

Haripur is traversed by several significant rivers, including the Indus, Sirin, Dauor, and Haro.

- The Indus River flows into Haripur from Darband in the northwest, flowing along the district's western boundary before exiting at Ghazi. It serves as the primary source for Tarbela Lake, a major reservoir in the region.
- The Sirin River, a tributary of the Indus, enters the district at Bir and merges into Tarbela Lake nearby. Though smaller than the Indus, it plays a vital role in the local hydrology.
- The Dauor River carries less water and follows a shorter, swifter course than the Sirin. Originating from the northern end of the Daunga Gali range, it flows through Haripur's plains and joins the Sirin near the northeastern edge of the Gandger range, approximately 8 kilometres upstream from Tarbela. Despite its modest size, the Dauor irrigates a substantial portion of the district.
- The Haro River rises from the southern slopes of the Dunga Gali range and splits into two main branches: the eastern Dhund and the western Karral Haro. These converge at the head of the Khanpur tract, and the unified river flows onward to the Khanpur Panjkatha. The Haro typically provides a reliable water supply for the surrounding areas.

The Hazara Waterfalls were discovered in 2021.

== Demographics ==
Historical population
Year	Pop.	±% p.a.
1951	252,168	—
1961	273,507	+0.82%
1972	417,561	+3.92%
1981	479,031	+1.54%
1998	692,228	+2.19%
2017	1,001,515	+1.96%
2023	1,174,783	+2.70%

As of the 2023 census, Haripur district has 192,451 households and a population of 1,174,783. The district has a sex ratio of 101.43 males to 100 females and a literacy rate of 74.88%: 84.13% for males and 65.61% for females. 282,230 (24.06% of the surveyed population) are under 10 years of age. 147,765 (12.58%) live in urban areas.

=== Languages ===
Languages of Haripur district (2023)
1. Hindko (80.3%)
2. Pashto (14.7%)
3. Urdu (2.00%)
4. Punjabi (1.01%)
5. Others (1.97%)

At the time of the 2023 census, 942,172 of the population spoke Hindko, 172,471 spoke Pashto, 23,423 Urdu, and 11,854 Punjabi and 23,136 others as their first language.

=== Ethnic groups ===
Gujjar is a major ethnic of the Haripur district. Other main ethnic groups of the Haripur include: Hindkowan and Kohistani.

=== Religion ===
Religion in contemporary Haripur District
Religious group	1941		2017		2023	
Religious group	Pop.	%	Pop.	%	Pop.	%
Islam	178,545	95.04%	1,000,322	99.88%	1,169,155	99.67%
Hinduism	7,278	3.87%	13	~0%	50	0.01%
Sikhism	2,011	1.07%	—N/a	—N/a	22	~0%
Christianity	14	0.01%	829	0.08%	3,570	0.30%
Other	6	0.01%	351	0.04%	259	0.02%
Total Population	187,854	100%	1,001,515	100%	1,173,056 (Note: Different from official population figure since it excludes sensitive areas where religion was not asked)	100%
Note: 1941 census data is for Haripur tehsil of erstwhile Hazara district, which roughly corresponds to contemporary Haripur district. District and tehsil borders have changed since 1941.

== Administration ==
The district of Haripur was a tehsil (sub-division) of the Abbottabad District until 1992. After that, it received the status of an independent district. Currently, Haripur District is divided into three Tehsils:

Tehsil	Name (Urdu) (Pashto)	Area (km²)	Pop. (2023)	Density (ppl/km²) (2023)	Literacy rate (2023)	Union Councils
Ghazi Tehsil	(Urdu: تحصیل غازی)	595	151,839	255.19	69.69%	
Haripur Tehsil	(Urdu: تحصیل ہری پور)	834	836,058	1,002.47	76.07%	
Khanpur Tehsil	(Urdu: تحصیل خانپور)	296	186,886	631.37	73.76%	

There were 30 Union Councils in 1962 and in 1979, 25 UC were reconstituted.

=== Provincial Assembly ===
Member of Provincial Assembly	Party affiliation	Constituency	Year
Akbar Ayub Khan	Pakistan Tehreek-e-Insaf	PK-46 Haripur-I	2024
Arshad Ayub Khan	Pakistan Tehreek-e-Insaf	PK-47 Haripur-II	2024
Faisal Zaman	Pakistan Tehreek-e-Insaf	PK-48 Haripur-III	2024

== Education ==
Haripur District has two government-funded postgraduate colleges, providing higher-level education, as well as four-degree colleges for women. The Haripur University was established in 2012, which was initially a Haripur campus (established in March 2008) of the Hazara University. The campus was upgraded to a full-fledged University of Haripur (UoH) in 2012 by the Government of Khyber Pakhtunkhwa.

In addition, the project of the Pak-Austria Fachhochschule Institute of Applied Sciences and Technology has also been functioning and is providing higher education since 2017 in village Mang at the main Khanpur Road in Haripur.

== See also ==
- State of Amb
- Khyber Pakhtunkhwa
- Pharhari
- Khan Zabardast Khan
- Tareen tribe
