= Shadiwal Hydropower Plant =

- Location within Pakistan
- Official name: Shadiwal Hydropower Plant
- Location: Shadiwal, Gujrat District, Punjab, Pakistan
- Coordinates: 32°30′38.80″N 74°00′36.27″E
- Status: Operational
- Opening date: June 1961
- Owner: Water and Power Development Authority (WAPDA)

Dam and spillways
- Impounds: Upper Jhelum Canal

Shadiwal Hydroelectric Plant
- Operator: WAPDA
- Commission date: June 1961
- Turbines: 2 x 6.75 MW
- Installed capacity: 13.5 MW
- Annual generation: 42.67 million units (GWh)

Shadiwal Hydropower Plant (SHPP) is a low-head hydroelectric generation station of 13.5 megawatt generation capacity (two units of 6.75 MW each), on the flows of Upper Jhelum Canal. It is located near Gujrat city at Shadiwal, 100 kilometer north-west of Lahore, in the Punjab province of Pakistan. It is a small hydropower generating plant constructed and put in commercial operation in June 1961 with the average annual generating capacity of 42.67 million units of least expensive electricity.

== See also ==
- List of dams and reservoirs in Pakistan
- List of power stations in Pakistan
- Khan Khwar Hydropower Project
- Satpara Dam
- Gomal Zam Dam
- Duber Khwar hydropower project
