= Golen Gol Hydropower Project =

Golen Gol Hydropower Plant
- Location within Pakistan
- Official name: Golen Gol Hydropower Plant
- Location: Chitral, Khyber Pakhtunkhwa, Pakistan
- Coordinates: 35°57′1.8″N 071°57′29.520″E
- Status: Completed & Operational
- Construction began: January 2011
- Opening date: January 2018
- Owner: Water and Power Development Authority (WAPDA)

Dam and spillways
- Type of dam: Gravity, roller-compacted concrete
- Impounds: Golen Gol River
- Height: 12 m (39 ft)
- Length: 60 m (200 ft)

Golen Gol Hydroelectric Plant
- Coordinates: 35°57′1.8″N 071°57′29.520″E
- Operator: WAPDA
- Commission date: January 2018
- Turbines: 3 x 35.3 MW Pelton-type
- Installed capacity: 106 MW
- Annual generation: 436 GWh

Golen Gol Hydropower Plant (GGHPP) is a hydroelectric power plant located on the Golen Gol River - a major left tributary of Mastuj River in Chitral District of Khyber Pakhtunkhwa province of Pakistan. The dam is located approximately 25 km from Chitral city, and 365 km from the provincial capital of Peshawar. Construction of Golen Gol project began in 2011, and was completed in January 2018.

== Construction and background ==
Golen Gol Hydropower Project is a run-of-the-river project designed for the generation of 108 MW consisting of three vertical Pelton wheel turbine units in one phase with average energy output of 436 Gwh. Golen Gol Hydropower Project is a part of least-cost energy generation plan, being executed by WAPDA to harness the indigenous hydropower resources of the country. WAPDA awarded the contract to SAMBU-SARCO joint venture comprising a Korean and a Pakistani firm. Sambu, an independent power provider (IPP), won the project in the last quarter of 2010 and construction work started in Jan 2011

Sambu has already successfully completed Pakistan's first IPP hydropower plant, 84MW New Bong Escape Hydropower Project, which is commercially operational since March 2013. The Korean company has also been awarded a contract to construct Pakistan's third IPP hydropower plant, 100MW Gulpur Hydropower Project on BOOT (Build, Own, Operate, Transfer) basis Joint Venture with other Korean firm and execution of work is in progress.

The Saudi Fund for Development is the major source of funding for the 108-MW Golen Gol hydropower project being developed by Pakistan's WAPDA. The Golen Gol project is also being funded by the Kuwait Fund for Arab Economic Development (KFD) and Organization of the Petroleum Exporting Countries (OPEC). Saudi Fund, Kuwait Fund and Opec Fund are providing $107 million for the construction of GGHPP.

== Major benefits and uses ==
On its completion, Golen Gol Hydropower project was planned to generate about 436 Mega Units (GWH) of inexpensive electricity annually to earn a revenue of about Rs 1 billion. Being an environment friendly hydropower project, it will help reduce dependence on expensive thermal power, thereby saving foreign exchange amounting to $34 million (equivalent to Rs 3 billion) to the country. According to estimation, Golen Gol hydropower project will add about Rs 9 billion per annum to the national economy through socio-economic uplift in the country caused by the project.

Construction of Golen Gol Hydropower Plant was commenced in June 2009 and the project is expected to be completed in October 2017. The total cost of the project is about PKR 16 billion. Golen Gol Hydropower Project is part of the least-cost energy generation plan of the Government of Pakistan. It is being executed by Wapda on priority basis to harness indigenous hydropower resources to improve the ratio of hydel electricity in the national grid and providing relief to the consumers.

== Salient features ==
Type: Concrete Diversion Weir
Diversion Weir Length: 60 m.
Diversion Weir Height: 12 m.
Design Discharge: 30 Cusecs
Headrace Tunnel Length: 3800m long, 3.7m in diameter
Gated Flushing Section Width: 19.72m
Sand Trap: 83.7m
Headrace Channel: 102m
Vertical and pressure shaft: 970m long, 2.5m dia
Surge Chambers: 42m high, 15m dia
Installed Capacity: 108 MW
Average Annual Energy Production: 436 GWh

The Intake weir will be about 1 km upstream of Babuka village. From the intake there will be a headrace channel leading to the tunnel, which will discharge the flow into the surge chamber and a combination of vertical and horizontal pressure shafts from where water flows to the surface powerhouse which is located on the left bank of Mastuj River, just downstream from the confluence of the Golen Gol and the Mastuj River.

== See also ==
- List of dams and reservoirs in Pakistan
- List of power stations in Pakistan
- Satpara Dam
- Allai Khwar Hydropower Project
- Gomal Zam Dam
