= Chichonki Malian Hydropower Plant =

Dam in Punjab, Pakistan

Chichoki Malian Hydropower Plant
- Location within Pakistan
- Official name: Chichoki Malian Hydropower Plant
- Location: Sheikhupura, Punjab, Pakistan
- Coordinates: 30°47′39″N 074°6′54″E
- Status: Operational
- Opening date: May 1959
- Owner: Water and Power Development Authority (WAPDA)

Dam and spillways
- Type of dam: run-of-the-river
- Impounds: Upper Chenab Canal

Chichoki Malian Hydroelectric Plant
- Coordinates: 31°47′39.11″N 74°6′55.23″E
- Operator: WAPDA
- Commission date: 1959
- Type: Run-of-Canal
- Turbines: 3 x 4.4 MW
- Installed capacity: 13.2 MW
- Annual generation: 22.88 million units (GWh)

Chichoki Malian Hydropower Plant (CMHPP) is a small, low-head, run-of-the-river hydroelectric generation station of 13.2 megawatts (17,700 hp) generation capacity (three units of 4.4 megawatts (5,900 hp)each), located at Sheikhupura, about 35 kilometres (22 mi) north-west of Lahore, Punjab province of Pakistan, on the flows of Upper Chenab Canal. It is a small hydro power generating plant constructed and put in commercial operation in May 1959 with the average annual generating capacity of 22.88 million GWh of inexpensive electricity. The project incharge is Syed Muhammad Munawwar Hussain, who is serving WAPDA since 2011.

== See also ==
- Duber Khwar Hydroelectric Plant
- Gomal Zam Dam
- Khan Khwar Hydropower Plant
- List of dams and reservoirs in Pakistan
- List of power stations in Pakistan
- Satpara Dam
