= Jabban Hydropower Plant =

Jabban Hydropower Plant (Malakand-I)
- Location within Pakistan
- Official name: Jabban Hydropower Plant (Malakand-I)
- Location: Malakand District, KPK, Pakistan
- Coordinates: 34°33′26.80″N 71°55′54.14″E
- Status: Operational
- Opening date: July 1938
- Owner: Water and Power Development Authority (WAPDA)

Dam and spillways
- Type of dam: run-of-the-river
- Impounds: Swat River

Jabban Hydropower Plant (Malakand-I)
- Operator: WAPDA
- Commission date: July 1938
- Turbines: 4 × 5.5 MW
- Installed capacity: 22 MW
- Annual generation: 122 million units (GWh)

Jabban (Malakand-I) Hydropower Plant (MHPP-I) is a small, low-head, run-of-the-river hydroelectric power generation station having 22 megawatt generation capacity (four units of 5.5 MW each) located at the Jabban area of the Malakand District in the Khyber Pakhtunkhwa province of Pakistan. It is situated on the Swat River. It is about 210 km from Pakistan's capital Islamabad, 45 km from the city of Mardan and 7 km upstream of 20 MW Dargai Hydropower Plant (Malakand-II). It is a small hydel power generating plant constructed and put in commercial operation in July, 1938, generating an average annual yield of 122 million units (GWh) of least expensive electricity.

== Old Jabban Power Station ==
Since its commissioning in 1937 with an initial installed capacity of 9.6 MW (3 units of 3.2 MW each), and addition of 10 MW (2 units of 5.0 MW each), Jabban Hydro Electric Power Station generated 5783.314 Gwh of cheap electricity till the last day of its operation on 12 November 2011.

== Fire incident ==
The 70-year-old power house was badly damaged due to a fire incident on 11 December 2006. The extent of damage was such that it was not possible to restore operation of the existing units. Moreover, the plant equipment had already outlived its life. The situation necessitated to carry out rehabilitation of Jabban Hydroelectric Power Station on "fast track basis" by installing new machines of higher efficiency at the same site.

The rehabilitation of the hydropower station was completed in 2013 with a total cost of Rs3.8 billion by the contractor HRL-CCPG JV (Habib Rafique Ltd. (Pakistan) & Central China Power Group China).

== Salient technical features ==
- Installed capacity: 22 MW (4 Units of 5.5 MW each)
- Annual net electrical output: 122 GWh
- Design discharge: 34 m^{3}/s (8.5 m^{3}/s per unit)
- Rated net: head 76.8 m
- Generation voltage: 11 kV
- Transmission voltage: 132 kV

== See also ==
- List of dams and reservoirs in Pakistan
- List of power stations in Pakistan
- Satpara Dam
- Gomal Zam Dam
- Duber Khwar hydropower project
