= Nandipur Power Project =

Thermal power plant in Punjab, Pakistan

Nandipur Thermal Power Project
- Country: Pakistan
- Location: Nandipur, Gujranwala, Punjab
- Coordinates: 32°14′32″N 74°16′08″E
- Status: Operational
- Construction began: 2008
- Commission date: March 2015
- Construction cost: Rs. 57.4 bn
- Owner: Government of Punjab
- Operator: Nandipur Thermal Power Generation Company Ltd.

Thermal power station
- Primary fuel: RLNG
- Tertiary fuel: Furnace
- Combined cycle?: Yes
- Cogeneration?: Yes

Power generation
- Nameplate capacity: 425 MW (with potential of 525 MW)

The Nandipur Power Project is a 425 MW (with potential of 525 MW) combined cycle thermal power plant situated at Nandipur near Gujranwala in the Punjab province of Pakistan. Being constructed by the China Dongfang Electric Corporation, the project was completed in March 2015. The initial cost of the project was Rs. 27 billion, but this escalated during the revised project cycle-1 and totalled Rs. 58.42 bn at completion. The power plant faced a series of hiccups during and after launching its commercial operations. Prior and after construction, the project continued to attract a number of court cases, inquiries, investigations, audits, and political and commercial disputes. The plant collapsed after 5 days of operation, launching a series of inquiries ordered by then prime minister Nawaz Sharif.

The plant produced electricity at Rs. 12 per unit, with less than 43% utilisation . In order to make the project viable and to reduce annual losses, it was finally decided to convert the plant to RLNG. After a tug-of-war with NEPRA and other controversies, the plant was finally converted to RLNG in 2017 .

== Construction ==
=== Crisis during inception ===
In January 2008, under a provision of the 18th amendment, the Government of Punjab, Pakistan signed a Rs. 23 billion ($329 million) contract with China Dongfang Electric Corporation of China to construct the Nandipur Power Project and paid a 10% down payment. A conflict between the Ministry of Water and Power and the Ministry of Law and Justice delayed the project execution for two years from March 2010 to March 2012. The Ministry of Law and Justice raised an objection over a violation of Public Procurement Regulatory Authority (PPRA) rules and the granting of the contract to China Dongfang Electric Corporation, which was blacklisted; the ministry further refused to vet the permissions before issuing an explanation of procedures. As a result, machinery worth $85 million remained stuck at the Karachi Port for over two years. In September 2012, the president of Dongfang Electric Corporation, Zhang Guorong, terminated the contract for the construction of the Nandipur Power Project, saying his company had suffered losses worth $85 million.

=== Project inauguration ===
In June 2013, Pakistan's Ministry of Water and Power started renegotiating the contract with Dongfang Electric Corporation to resume work on the Nandipur Power Project. After successful negotiations, the firm agreed to resume work on the power station. On 8 July 2013, engineers of Dongfang Electric Corporation arrived in Karachi to inspect the machinery lying at the Karachi Port and to secure its release. Later, work on the project was restarted, with an escalated cost of Rs. 57.4 bn. After several delays, the project was finally inaugurated by the Prime Minister of Pakistan Nawaz Sharif on 31 May 2014. However, the plant remained operational for only five days after the inauguration and had to be shut down due to mismanagement, conflicts with the National Electric Power Regulatory Authority (NEPRA) over high production costs, and the use of inappropriate fuel. Since then, the plant has faced several controversies and operational failures, yielding inquiries and probes into misappropriations within the project.

== Operational crisis and revival ==
=== Inquiries over failure ===
The energy produced by Nandipur was extremely expensive, at Rs. 42 per unit, and the project was shut down after five days of operation. Besides ineffective cost, the plant ran at less than 42% efficiency, even less than decades-old power plants in the country such as Hub Power Company plants set up in the 1990s, which produce energy at Rs. 7.65 per unit(kwh). After this failure, the prime minister of Pakistan Nawaz Sharif ordered two separate audits: one by an auditing firm of international repute and the other by the auditor general of Pakistan. The handpicked auditing firm A. F. Ferguson & Co. refused to become part of the controversy, restricting itself to a financial audit only. It was revealed after the audit that:

- The position of managing director was created by the chief minister of Punjab as his personal choice, while no such position was included in the original provision.
- A grade 19 officer of Parks Horticulture Authority (PHA), Cap. (R) Muhammad Mehmood, was appointed as managing director with a high salary, without any professional experience applicable to the post.
- The managing director commissioned a low-capacity furnace oil treatment plant (FOTP) without consulting technical staff and engineers at the plant. This resulted in total collapse of the furnace-operated plant.
- The initial startup of the plant was done with the wrong choice of fuel, damaging the plant and requiring invocation of the O&M contract.
- To cover up mistakes, wrong contracts were awarded for O&M to incompetent firms on a long-term basis, resulting finally in the cessation of the project.

=== Administrative changes ===
Since the inauguration of the project, the plant became the highlight of media criticism and opposition parties have raised questions around it, causing political damage to the government. After the revelation of an audit report and inquiry outcomes in October 2015, Nawaz Sharif took immediate action and changed the administration of the project. The control of the project was handed over from the government of Punjab the Ministry of Water and Power, and controversial managing director Cap. (R) Muhammad Mehmood was replaced by Tariq Bhatti. Shahzad Akbar was appointed project director. Minister of water and power Khawaja Asif publicly admitted the failure of the project due to administrative lapses and mismanagement.

=== Conflicts with NEPRA ===
The energy produced by the plant was extremely expensive, at Rs. 42 per unit, with less than 40% efficiency; however, NEPRA fixed the cost in April 2015 to Rs 11.63 per unit. The government appealed to increase this cost to Rs. 15.63 per unit, demanding a total of Rs. 23 billion to be recovered from consumers. The Ministry of Water and Power pleaded that the plant would go bankrupt with annual losses and production costs being much higher than the tariffs. NEPRA heard the appeal on 29 January 2016 and rejected it, declining to pass any further financial burdens to the consumer. After NEPRA refused to increase tariffs in a second review, the government decided to take the case to court in September 2016. NEPRA referred to the already presented report citing inefficiency of the plant and once again refused to pass any additional fuel costs and inefficiencies to the consumer. The annual losses and high production costs resulted in the closure of the plant in June 2016. NEPRA raised question marks over the loss of billions of rupees against closure of the plant after June 2016 . To understand the scale of problem, the National Transmission & Dispatch Company (NTDC) reported that Nandipur was incurring losses beyond recovery including interests on loans taken for commissioning, and interests on loans taken each month due to operational cost overruns. For example, in June 2016, the plant incurred Rs. 4.46 billion in losses to national the exchequer, generating costly electricity and not recovering its generation cost. Another conflict surfaced in February 2017, when Hydro Electric Power System Engineering Company (HEPSEC) of China was awarded an O&M contract on 85 paisa per unit, 80% higher than the permitted rate of 48 paisa per unit by NEPRA. The permitted rate on planned gas conversion at the plant was even less, at 34 paisa per unit.

=== Conversion to regasified liquefied natural gas (RLNG) ===
Even after becoming operational, the Nandipur Power Project produced unsustainable levels of per-unit power, with average capacity of around 40% utilisation. Federal Secretary of the Ministry of Water and Power Mohammad Younus Dagha admitted that a gas-fired plant in Punjab, which suffered gas shortages in 2008, was a bad idea in the first place, and running it with regular losses was adding further insult to injury. He suggested that with adequate LNG available, it should be converted to gas. In late 2016, the Economic Coordination Committee (ECC) finally approved a loan of Rs 30.6 bn to convert Nandipur to gas operation. On 23 April 2017, Nandipur started a 525 MW test run on regasified liquefied natural gas (RLNG) with 30 million cubic feet (850 thousand cubic metres) per day of gas supply from Sui Northern Gas Pipelines limited (SNGPL). However, even after the conversion, the plant was unable to sustain a financial balance between generation cost and recovery from its production. For example, in April 2018, Sui Northern Gas Pipelines Limited (SNGPL) disconnected gas supply to the plant for defaulting on dues of approximately Rs. 900 million. Along with conversion to RLNG, an operation and maintenance (O&M) contract was signed for 10 years between Northern Power Generation Company Limited (NPGCL) and the Hydro Electric Power System Engineering Company (HEPSEC) of China. However, commencement of operations and maintenance were delayed due to several bureaucratic issues . Despite its production costs and other scandals, the plant produced 460 MW - 480 MW with its four turbines operating on gas and another one on steam before its one-month scheduled closure on 6 March 2018.

== Scams, scandals, and probe ==
=== Initial inquires ===
Initial inquires were launched against plant failure after just five days of operation. The inquires were ordered by Prime minister Nawaz Sharif amid political embarrassment caused by the failure. The investigations mostly revolved around the following questions :

- How a Furnace Oil Treatment Plant (FOTP) of smaller capacity was installed at the site.
- The role of MD Nandipur and NESPAK in the aforementioned installation.
- Who misled prime minister Nawaz Sharif during the inauguration of the plant, causing embarrassment to the government.
- Who conveyed to General Electric (GE) an incorrect quantum of furnace oil information and its filtration requirements.
- The plant was run with the wrong fuel, damaging it while its new parts took a further three months to arrive.
- Why MD Captain(R) Muhammad Mehmood tried to sublet the operation and maintenance (O&M) to a Malaysian firm and then again to a US firm despite the fact that a fully computerised plant hardly requires outsourcing.
- The plant's managing director himself attended training in the US while the plant's technical staff were restricted from it. Even staff sent to China for training were not engaged in any work, and were sidelined without having any involvement in technical operations.

Questions were also posed to Shehbaz Sharif, including:

- Appointment of controversial Parks and Horticulture Authority (PHA) officer Capt. (R) Muhammad Mehmood as managing director of Nandipur despite his lack of technical experience or qualifications.
- The awarding of 1,600% higher remuneration and later decorating him with the Tamgha-e-Imtiaz honour despite the Nandipur fiasco.
- Violation of Public Procurement Regulatory Authority (PPRA) rules in purchases and misappropriation of funds.
- Awarding of the contract to blacklisted company China Dongfang Electric Corporation .

The escalation of costs during the PPP regime raised question around ex-minister for Water and Power Raja Pervaiz Ashraf, ex-law minister Dr. Babar Awan, and former law secretary Pir Masood Chishti. They allegedly played a role in the delay of the project by impeding approval of the project and causing losses to taxpayers.

=== Destruction of critical project records ===
In September 2016, most critical record of fuel payments and other multi-million rupee embezzlements were torched despite tight security arrangements. Additionally, important computerised import records were deleted from computer systems and backup disks. This happened while opposition politicians were already raising concerns around the burning of records in high-profile cases in Punjab. Two guards were arrested on the basis of complaints by chief security officer (CSO) Rana Mahtab Alam. He himself was later found guilty of similar offences and dismissed from his post. In the same month, a Pakistan Electric Power Company team dug into the damage done to the records, and found that most of the alleged proof of corruption was destroyed. The guards arrested in the case admitted that they had burned and shredded records on the orders of the CSO. CSO Rana Mahtab Alam was granted pre-arrest bail and several extensions afterwards; nevertheless, he was unable to explain his actions. In November 2016, Alam fled the court after his bail was cancelled, crippling further progress in the case.

=== NAB inquiry over alleged corruption ===
Nandipur lodged complaints against several corruption and misappropriation allegations after the appearance of an AGP report in October 2015. Senator Aitzaz Ahsan demanded the National Accountability Bureau of Pakistan commence a probe of the multi-billion scandal and regular losses caused to the national exchequer by the project. The NAB launched an inquiry amid complaints raised after the AGP reported accounting escalations in cost, allegations of corruption and irregularities, and violations of procedures within the project. However, the inquiry faced serious hurdles after critical records were destroyed by the security apparatus inside the plant on unknown directives. The inquiry stalled for two years before the public accounts committee (PAC) directed the NAB in October 2017 to complete the pending probe of the Nandipur project and to expedite its investigation over the multi-million corruption scam. In December 2017, the NAB filed a reference of corruption and alleged misappropriations within Nandipur along with the illegal construction of a road to the Sharif family residence. The NAB also extended the scope of the inquiry by accusing PPP's former Water and Power minister Raja Pervez Ashraf, ex-law minister Dr. Baber Awan, former law secretary Pir Masood Chishti, and other bureaucrats of causing losses due to delays in the project.

== Ownership ==
The Nandipur Power Project is owned by the Government of Punjab and operated by the Nandipur Thermal Power Generation Company Limited, which was incorporated on 2 January 2014, with its head office located in Lahore.

== See also ==
- List of dams and reservoirs in Pakistan
- List of power stations in Pakistan
- Satpara Dam
- Allai Khwar Hydropower Project
- Gomal Zam Dam
