= Renala Khurd Hydropower Plant =

- Location within Pakistan
- Official name: Renala Khurd Hydropower Plant
- Location: Renala Khurd, Okara District, Punjab, Pakistan
- Coordinates: 30°52′57.70″N 073°35′52.77″E
- Status: Operational
- Construction began: 1922
- Opening date: March 22, 1925
- Owner: Water and Power Development Authority (WAPDA)

Dam and spillways
- Type of dam: run-of-the-river
- Impounds: Lower Bari Doab Canal

Renala Khurd Hydroelectric Plant
- Coordinates: 36°6′55″N 73°55′0″E
- Operator: WAPDA
- Commission date: 1925
- Turbines: 5 x 22 kW (30 hp)
- Installed capacity: 1.1 MW (1,500 hp)
- Annual generation: 3.61 GWh (13.0 TJ)

Renala Khurd Hydropower Plant (RKHPP), also known as Ganga Ram Powerhouse, and Zaheer-ud-Din Babar Powerhouse, is a small, low-head, run-of-the-river hydroelectric generation station with a 1.1 megawatts (1,500 hp) capacity, located at Renala Khurd, Okara District, North-East of Punjab province of Pakistan, on the flows of Lower Bari Doab Canal. It is located about 116 kilometres (72 mi) away from Lahore and 18 kilometres (11 mi) away from the district capital Okara city towards south-west of Lahore on national highway (GT Road) and on Lahore-Karachi main railway line. Having five turbine units, each rated for 22 kW (30 hp) production capacity, this plant was set up to meet the electricity needs of the Mitchells Fruit Farms and Food Processing.

== History ==
Sir Ganga Ram (1851–1927), a civil engineer and philanthropist, established Renala Hydral Power Station in 1925, Pakistan's (Indian subcontinent's) first hydropower station.

== See also ==
- List of dams and reservoirs in Pakistan
- List of power stations in Pakistan
- Satpara Dam
- Allai Khwar Hydropower Project
- Gomal Zam Dam
