= Chitral hydel power =

Chitral Hydel Power Station
- Official name: Chitral Hydel Power
- Location: Chitral, Khyber Pakhtunkhwa, Pakistan
- Purpose: Power Generation
- Owner: Water and Power Development Authority (WAPDA)

Power Station
- Turbines: 2 x 200 kW 2 x 300 kW
- Installed capacity: 1 MW
- Annual generation: 4.13 GWh

Chitral hydel power is a hydroelectric power station which is located on the right bank of Lutkho river and 5 km upstream of Chitral city. The flow of Lutkho river was diverted by a 3.72 km long channel. The power station is equipped with 2 units of 200 kW and 2 units of 300 kW each to cumulatively generate 1 MW of electricity. The power generated from the power station is being provided to the Chitral city through an 11 kV transmission line. The project was commissioned in 1975.

== See also ==
- List of dams and reservoirs in Pakistan
- List of power stations in Pakistan
- Satpara Dam
- Allai Khwar Hydropower Project
- Gomal Zam Dam
