= Dargai Hydropower Plant =

Dargai Hydropower Plant (Malakand-II)
- Location within Pakistan
- Official name: Dargai Hydropower Plant (Malakand-II)
- Location: Dargai, Malakand District, KPK, Pakistan
- Coordinates: 34°31′07.77″N 71°55′08.11″E
- Status: Operational
- Opening date: December 1952
- Owner: Water and Power Development Authority (WAPDA)

Dam and spillways
- Impounds: Swat River

Dargai Hydropower Plant (Malakand-II)
- Operator: WAPDA
- Commission date: December 1952
- Type: Run-of-the-river
- Turbines: 4 × 5.0 MW
- Installed capacity: 20 MW
- Annual generation: 162 million units (GWh)

Dargai (Malakand-II) Hydropower Plant (MHPP-II) is a small, low-head, run-of-the-river hydroelectric power generation station having about 20 megawatt generation capacity (four units of 5.0 MW each). It is located at the region of Dargai, Malakand within the province of Khyber Pajhtunkhwa, Pakistan. It is functions on the flow of the Swat River. It is about 210 km far from Pakistan's capital Islamabad and 45 km from the city of Mardan. It is a small hydel power generating plant constructed and put in commercial operation in December, 1952, generating an average annual yield of 162 million units (GWh) of much needed least expensive electricity.

== Technical features ==
Installed capacity: 20 MW (4 Units of 5.0 MW each)
Annual Net Electrical Output: 162 GWh
Design Discharge: 34 m^{3}/s (8.5 m^{3}/s per unit)
Rated Net: Head 76.8 m
Generation Voltage: 11 kV
Transmission Voltage: 132 kV

== See also ==
- List of dams and reservoirs in Pakistan
- List of power stations in Pakistan
- Khan Khwar Hydropower Project
- Satpara Dam
- Gomal Zam Dam
- Duber Khwar hydropower project
