= Kurram Garhi Hydropower Plant =

- Location within Pakistan
- Official name: Kurram Garhi Hydropower Plant
- Location: Kurram Garhi, Bannu, Khyber Pakhtunkhwa
- Coordinates: 33°02′00.48″N 70°31′56.09″E
- Status: Operational
- Opening date: February 1958
- Owner: Water and Power Development Authority (WAPDA)

Dam and spillways
- Type of dam: run-of-the-river
- Impounds: Kuchkot Canal from Kurram River

Kurram Garhi Hydropower Plant
- Operator: WAPDA
- Commission date: February 1958
- Turbines: 4 x 1.00 MW
- Installed capacity: 4 MW
- Annual generation: 17 million units (GWh)

Kurram Garhi Hydropower Plant (KGHPP) is a small, low-head, run-of-the-river hydroelectric power generation station at Kurram Garhi, a small town in Bannu in Pakistan's Khyber Pakhtunkhwa. The station with a 4-megawatt generation capacity (four units of 1 MW each), is located on the flows of Kuchkot Canal from Kurram River. It is a small hydel power generating plant constructed and put in commercial operation in February 1958 with the average annual electricity generation capacity of 17 million units (GWh) of least expensive electricity.

== See also ==
- List of dams and reservoirs in Pakistan
- List of power stations in Pakistan
- Khan Khwar Hydropower Project
- Baran Dam
- Gomal Zam Dam
- Duber Khwar hydropower project
