= List of power stations in Pakistan =

Location of notable power stations in Pakistan
Nuclear, wind/solar, coal/oil/gas, hydroelectric

Pakistan has a total installed power generation capacity of 49,270 MW as of 13 September, 2024 which includes 28,766 MW thermal, 11,519 MW hydroelectric, 1,838 MW wind, 780 MW solar, 249 MW bagasse, 3,620 MW nuclear and 2,498 MW of net metering capacity.

== Thermal ==
=== In service ===
Currently in operation power plants.

S/N	Station	Location	Capacity (MW)	Primary fuel	Completion year
1	TPS Jamshoro	Jamshoro, Sindh	880	RFO+gas	
2	TPS Guddu (Units 5-10)	Guddu, Sindh	600	Gas	
3	TPS Guddu (Units 11-13)	Guddu, Sindh	415	Gas	
4	TPS Guddu (Units 14-16)	Guddu, Sindh	747	Gas	
5	TPS Quetta	Quetta, Balochistan	28	Gas	
6	TPS Muzaffargarh	Muzaffargarh, Punjab	1,350	Gas	
7	TPS Nandipur	Gujranwala, Punjab	567	Gas	
8	Lal Pir Power	Mehmood Kot, Punjab	362	RFO	
9	Pak Gen. Power	Mehmood Kot, Punjab	365	RFO	
10	Kohinoor Energy Ltd	Lahore, Punjab	131	RFO	1997
11	Fauji Kabirwala	Kabirwala, Punjab	170	Gas	1999
12	Hub Power	Hub, Balochistan	1,292	RFO	
13	KAPCO	Kot Addu, Punjab	1,600	Gas	
14	Rousch Power	Sidhnai, Punjab	450	Gas	
15	Saba Power Company Ltd	Sheikhupura, Punjab	136	RFO	
16	Uch Power	Murad Jamali, Balochistan	586	Gas	2000
17	TNB Liberty Power	Daharki, Sindh	235	Gas	2001
18	Attock Gen.	Attock Morgah, Punjab	165	RFO	2009
19	Atlas Power	Sheikhupura, Punjab	224	RFO	
20	Engro Power Gen. Qadirpur	Qadirpur, Sindh	227	Gas	2010
21	Saif Power	Sahiwal, Punjab	225	Gas	2010
22	Orient Power	Balloki, Punjab	225	Gas	2010
23	Nishat Power	Qasur, Punjab	202	RFO	2010
24	Nishat Chunian	Qasur, Punjab	202	RFO	2010
25	Xenel Sapphire Electric	Muridke, Punjab	235	Gas	2010
26	Halmore Power	Bhikki, Punjab	225	Gas	2011
27	Narowal Energy	Narowal, Punjab	214	RFO	2011
28	Liberty Power Tech.	Faisalabad, Punjab	202	RFO	2011
29	Foundation Power	Daharki, Sindh	179	Gas	2011
30	Uch-II Power	Murad Jamali, Balochistan	404	Low BTU gas	2014
31	Sahiwal Coal Power Plant	Sahiwal, Punjab	1,320	Bituminous coal	2017
32	QATPL (Bhikki)	Bhikki, Punjab	1,180	Regasified-LNG	2018
33	NPPMCL (Haveli Bahadur Shah)	HBS, Jhang, Punjab	1,230	Regasified-LNG	2018
34	NPPMCL (Balloki)	Balloki, Punjab	1,223	Regasified-LNG	2018
35	Port Qasim Electric Power	Port Qasim, Sindh	1,320	Bituminous coal	2018
36	China Power Hub	Lasbella, Balochistan	1,320	Bituminous coal	2019
37	Engro Powergen Thar	Tharparkar, Sindh	660	Lignite (Thar coal)	2019
38	Bin Qasim TPS-I	Karachi, Sindh	840	Dual	
39	Bin Qasim TPS-II	Karachi, Sindh	572	Dual	
40	Bin Qasim TPS-III	Karachi, Sindh	942	Regasified-LNG	
41	Korangi Town GTPS-II	Karachi, Sindh	107	Gas	
42	Site GTPS-II	Karachi, Sindh	107	Gas	
43	Korangi CCPP	Karachi, Sindh	248	Gas	
44	Gul Ahmed	Karachi, Sindh	136	RFO	
45	Tapal Energy	Karachi, Sindh	126	RFO	
46	SNPCL-I (IPP-2002)	Jamshoro, Sindh	52	Gas	
47	SNPCL-II (IPP-2002)	Jamshoro, Sindh	52	Gas	
48	Intl. Steel Limited (CPP)	Karachi, Sindh	19	Gas	
49	Intl. Ind. Limited (CPP)	Karachi, Sindh	4	Gas	
50	FFBL Power	Karachi, Sindh	52	Bituminous coal / lignite (Thar coal)	
51	Lotte Chemicals	Karachi, Sindh	14	Gas	
52	Lucky Cement	Lakki Marwat, KPK	5	Gas	
53	Lucky Electric Power Co. Ltd	Bin Qasim, Sindh	660	Bituminous coal / lignite (Thar coal)	2022
54	Thar Energy	Tharparkar, Sindh	330	Lignite (Thar coal)	2022
55	Punjab Thermal (PTPL)	Jhang, Punjab	1,263	Regasified-LNG	2023
56	Thar Coal Block-1 Power	Tharparkar, Sindh	1,320	Lignite (Thar coal)	2023
57	ThalNova Power	Tharparkar, Sindh	330	Lignite (Thar coal)	2023
Total capacity		28,275 MW			

=== Under construction ===
S/N	Station	Location	Capacity (MW)	Primary fuel	Status
1	Coal Power Project, Jamshoro	Jamshoro, Sindh	1,320	Bituminous coal / lignite (Thar coal)	
Total capacity		1,320 MW			

== Nuclear ==
=== In service ===
S/N	Station	Location	Capacity (MW)	Year in service
1	(CHASNUPP-1)	Mianwali, Punjab	325	2000
2	(CHASNUPP-2)	Mianwali, Punjab	325	2011
3	(CHASNUPP-3)	Mianwali, Punjab	340	2016
4	(CHASNUPP-4)	Mianwali, Punjab	340	2017
5	(KANUPP-2)	Karachi, Sindh	1,145	2021
6	(KANUPP-3)	Karachi, Sindh	1,145	2022
Total capacity		3,620 MW		

=== Under construction ===
S/N	Station	Location	Capacity (MW)	Status
1	(CHASNUPP-5)	Mianwali, Punjab	1,200	Groundbreaking performed on July 14, 2023.
Total capacity		1,200 MW		

== Hydro ==
=== In service ===
S/N	Station	Location	Type of power station	Capacity (MW)	In-service year
1	Renala	Renala, Punjab	Run of canal	1	1925
2	Malakand / Jabban	Malakand, KPK	Run of river	22	1935
3	Rasul	Mandi Bahauddin, Punjab	Run of canal	22	1952
4	Dargai	Malakand, KPK	Run of canal	20	1952
5	Kurram Garhi	Kurram Garhi, KPK	Run of canal	4	1958
6	Chichonki Malian	Sheikhupura, Punjab	Run of canal	13	1959
7	Warsak	Peshawar, KPK	Run of river	243	1960
8	Shadiwal	Shadiwal city, Punjab	Run of canal	14	1961
9	Nandipur	Gujranwala, Punjab	Run of canal	14	1963
10	Mangla	Mirpur, Azad Kashmir	Reservoir	1350	1967
11	Chitral	Chitral, KPK	Run of canal	1	1975
12	Tarbela	Tarbela, KPK	Reservoir	4,888	1977
13	Chashma	Chashma, Punjab	Run of river	184	2000
14	Jagran	Neelum, Azad Kashmir	Hydro	30	2000
15	Ghazi-Barotha	Attock, Punjab	Run of river	1,450	2003
16	Malakand-III	Malakand, KPK	Run of river/canal	84	2008
17	Khan Khwar	Shangla, KPK	Reservoir	72	2010
18	Pehur	Swabi, KPK	Canal fall/run of river	18	2010
19	Jinnah	Jinnah Barrage, Punjab	Run of river	96	2012
20	Garam Chashma	Chitral, KPK	Hydro	1	2012
21	Allai Khwar	Mansehra, KPK	Reservoir	121	2013
22	Gomal Zam	South Waziristan	Reservoir	17	2013
23	New Bong Escape (Laraib Energy)	Mirpur, Azad Kashmir	Hydro	84	2013
24	Duber Khwar	Kohistan, KPK	Reservoir	130	2014
25	Patrind Hydro	Muzaffarabad, Azad Kashmir	Run of river	147	2017
26	Golen Gol	Chitral, KPK	Run of river	108	2018
27	Neelum–Jhelum	Muzaffarabad, Azad Kashmir	Run of river	969	2018
28	Marala Hydro (PPDCL)	Sialkot, Punjab	Canal fall/run of river	8	2018
29	Gulpur Hydropower Plant, Barali	Kotli, Azad Kashmir	Run of river	100	2020
30	Daral Khwar	Swat District, KPK	Run of river	37	2021
31	Ranolia	Kohistan, KPK	High head	17	2021
32	Karot	Azad Kashmir / Punjab	Run of river	720	2022
33	Suki Kinari	Mansehra District, KPK	Run of river	884	2024
Total capacity				11,519 MW	

=== Under construction ===
S/N	Station	Location	Capacity (MW)	Status
1	Keyal Khwar	Lower Kohistan, Khyber Pakhtunkhwa	128	Under construction
2	Dasu	Dasu Town	4,320	Under construction. Stage-I: 2,160 MW to be completed by December 2027.
3	Tarbela 5th Ext.	Tarbela, KPK	1,530	Under construction. To be completed by December 2026.
4	Mohmand	Mohmand Tribal District, KP	800	Under construction. To be completed by 2027.
5	Diamer Basha	Near Chilas, KP & GB	4,500	Under construction. To be completed by February 2029.
6	Kurram Tangi	North Waziristan, KP	83	Under construction. 61% completed.
7	Mangla Refurbishment Project	Mirpur, Azad Kashmir	310	WAPDA successfully commissioned two refurbished generating units of the Mangla Hydel Power Station on May 23, 2022, increasing their capacity from 200MW to 270MW. Refurbishment of remaining units is under construction. Upon completion, it will enhance generation capacity of existing power stations from 1000MW to 1310MW.
Total capacity			11,671 MW	

== Wind ==
=== In service ===
S/N	Station	Location	Capacity (MW)	In-service date
1	Zorlu Enerji Pakistan (Pvt.) Ltd	Thatta, Sindh	56	2013
2	FFC Energy	Thatta, Sindh	50	2013
3	Three Gorges First Wind Farm	Thatta, Sindh	50	2014
4	Foundation Wind Energy – I	Thatta, Sindh	50	2015
5	Foundation Wind Energy – II	Thatta, Sindh	50	2015
6	Sapphire Wind	Thatta, Sindh	53	2015
7	Yunus Energy	Thatta, Sindh	50	2016
8	Metro Power Company	Thatta, Sindh	50	2016
9	Gul Ahmad Wind	Thatta, Sindh	50	2016
10	Master Wind Energy	Thatta, Sindh	50	2016
11	Tenaga Generai	Thatta, Sindh	50	2016
12	HydroChina Dawood Wind Power	Thatta, Sindh	50	2017
13	Sachal Energy Development	Thatta, Sindh	50	2017
14	United Energy Pakistan Wind Power	Thatta, Sindh	99	2017
15	Artistic Wind Power	Thatta, Sindh	50	2018
16	Act Wind (Tapal Wind)	Thatta, Sindh	30	2018
17	Hawa Energy	Thatta, Sindh	50	2018
18	Jhampir Power	Thatta, Sindh	50	2018
19	Three Gorges Second Wind Farm	Thatta, Sindh	50	2018
20	Three Gorges Third Wind Farm	Thatta, Sindh	50	2018
21	Tricon Boston Consulting-A	Thatta, Sindh	50	2019
22	Tricon Boston Consulting-B	Thatta, Sindh	50	2019
23	Tricon Boston Consulting-C	Thatta, Sindh	50	2019
24	Zephyr Power	Thatta, Sindh	50	2019
25	Din Energy Limited	Thatta, Sindh	50	2022
26	Lucky Renewables PVt. Ltd (TRICOM)	Thatta, Sindh	50	2022
27	Master Green Energy Ltd	Thatta, Sindh	50	2022
28	Act 2 Din Wind Pvt Ltd	Thatta, Sindh	50	2022
29	Artistic Wind Power Pvt. Ltd	Thatta, Sindh	50	2022
30	Indus Wind Energy Limited	Thatta, Sindh	50	2022
31	Lakeside Energy	Thatta, Sindh	50	2022
32	Liberty Wind Power-1	Thatta, Sindh	50	2022
33	Gul Ahmed Electric Limited	Thatta, Sindh	50	2022
34	Liberty Wind Power-II (Pvt.) Ltd	Thatta, Sindh	50	2022
35	NASDA Green Energy (Pvt) Limited	Thatta, Sindh	50	2022
36	Metro 2 Wind Power Limited	Thatta, Sindh	50	2022
Total capacity			1,838 MW	

== Solar ==
=== In service ===
S/N	Station	Location	Capacity (MW)	In-service date
1	Quaid-e-Azam Solar Park	Bahawalpur, Punjab	100	2015
2	Appolo Solar Development	Bahawalpur, Punjab	100	2016
3	Best Green Energy	Bahawalpur, Punjab	100	2016
4	Crest Energy	Bahawalpur, Punjab	100	2016
5	AJ Power Pvt. Ltd.	Khushab, Punjab	12	2017
6	Harappa Solar Pvt. Ltd	Sahiwal, Punjab	18	2017
7	Oursun Pakistan	Thatta, Sindh	50	2019
8	Gharo Solar	Thatta, Sindh	50	2020
9	Atlas Solar (Zhenfa Pakistan New Energy Company Limited)	Layyah, Punjab	100	2022
10	Meridian Energy (Pvt.) Ltd	Sukkur, Sindh	50	2024
11	HNDS Energy (Pvt.) Limited	Sukkur, Sindh	50	2024
12	Helios Power (Pvt.) Limited	Sukkur, Sindh	50	2024
Total capacity		780 MW		

== Bagasse / biomass ==
=== In service ===
S/N	Station	Location	Capacity (MW)	In-service date
1	Jamal Din Wali-II	Rahim Yar Khan, Punjab	26	12 Jun, 2014
2	Jamal Din Wali-III	Rahim Yar Khan, Punjab	27	3 Oct, 2014
3	RYK Mills	Rahim Yar Khan, Punjab	40	24 Mar, 2015
4	Chiniot Power	Chiniot, Punjab	63	28 Nov, 2015
5	Hamza Sugar Mills	Rahim Yar Khan, Punjab	15	Mar, 2017
6	The Thal Industries Corporation	Layyah, Punjab	20	
7	Almoiz Industries	Mianwali, Punjab	36	Feb, 2019
8	Chanar Energy	Faisalabad, Punjab	22	Feb, 2019
Total capacity		249 MW		

== Net metering ==
=== In service ===
As of 30 June, 2024, Pakistan has an installed net metering capacity of 7,000+ MW.

S/N	Station	Capacity (MW)
1	Net metering capacity of consumers in DISCOS	6,500
2	Net metering capacity of consumers in KE	700+
Total capacity	2,498 MW	

== Total capacity ==
=== Total installed capacity ===
S/N	Energy source	Installed capacity (MW)
1	Thermal	28,275
2	Nuclear	3,620
3	Hydro	11,519
4	Wind	1,838
5	Solar	780
6	Bagasse/biomass	249
7	Net metering	6,500
Total installed capacity		52,781 MW

=== Total under construction capacity ===
S/N	Energy source	Under construction capacity (MW)
1	Thermal	1,320
2	Nuclear	1,200
3	Hydro	11,671
Total under construction capacity		14,191 MW

== See also ==
- Electricity in Pakistan
- Energy policy of Pakistan
- List of hydroelectric power stations in Pakistan
- List of power stations in Asia
- List of largest power stations in the world
- Iran–Pakistan–India gas pipeline
