= Bhikki Power Plant =

Pakistani power plant

- Country: Pakistan
- Location: Sheikhupura, Punjab
- Coordinates: 31.603°N 73.904°E
- Status: Operational
- Construction began: 2016
- Commission date: 2018
- Construction cost: 919.8 Million US $
- Owner: Government of Punjab
- Operator: Quaid-e-Azam Thermal Power Limited (QATPL)
- Combined cycle?: Yes

Power generation
- Make and model: GE H-class 9HA.01 gas turbines
- Nameplate capacity: 1,180 MW

External links
- Website: qathermal.com

The Bhikki Power Plant is a 1,180 MW RLNG based combined cycle power plant located near Sheikhupura, in the Punjab province of Pakistan.

This is the first RLNG based power plant which is developed by Government of Punjab through its own resources. The plant is owned and operated by Quaid-e-Azam Thermal Power Limited (QATPL), a company wholly owned by the government of Punjab. It is one of the three major RLNG power plants including Haveli Bahadur Shah and Balloki which were built between 2015 and 2018 to curb the electricity loadshedding in Pakistan. Letter of Intent (LOI) was issued on 13 May, 2015 and the project achieved its commercial operations in just 34 months on May 20, 2018.

== See also ==
- List of dams and reservoirs in Pakistan
- List of power stations in Pakistan
- Haveli Bahadur Shah Power Plant
- Balloki Power Plant
- Punjab thermal power plant
