= Gulpur Hydropower Plant =

- Location within Pakistan
- Official name: Gulpur Hydropower Plant
- Location: Gulpur, Kotli District, Kotli Town of AJK, Pakistan
- Coordinates: 33°27′19″N 73°51′45″E
- Status: Operational
- Construction began: January 2014
- Opening date: February 2020
- Owner: Mira Power Private Limited

Dam and spillways
- Type of dam: Gravity, roller-compacted concrete
- Impounds: Poonch River, a tributary of Jhelum River
- Height: 35 m (115 ft)
- Length: 238 m (781 ft)

Reservoir
- Total capacity: 21,893,000 m^{3} (17,749 acre⋅ft)
- Catchment area: 3,625 km^{2} (1,400 mi^{2})

Gulpur Hydroelectric Plant
- Operator: Korea South-East Power Company (KOSEP)
- Commission date: February 2020
- Turbines: 2 x 51 MW Kaplan-type
- Installed capacity: 102 MW gross
- Annual generation: 465 GWh

Gulpur Hydropower Plant (GHPP) is an operational run-of-the-river hydroelectric generation project located on Poonch River, a major tributary of Jhelum River near Gulpur in Kotli District of Azad Kashmir, Pakistan. The site is about 167 km from Federal Capital Islamabad and 285 kilometres (177 mi) from Punjab's Provincial Capital Lahore and is approachable directly from Islamabad and Lahore by a two-lane, all-weather, paved, partly mountainous road. The location of the project is about 28 km upstream of Mangla Dam Reservoir.

Gulpur Hydropower Project is a run-of-the-river project designed for the generation of 100 megawatts (130,000 hp) consisting of two Kaplan-type turbine units with an average energy output of 436 Gwh. Gulpur Hydropower Project is a part of least-cost energy generation plan, being executed by WAPDA to harness the indigenous hydropower resources of the country. WAPDA awarded the contract to MIRA Power Limited, a subsidiary of Korean company KOSEP, an independent power producer (IPP) being developed in the private sector on a BOOT basis (Build, Own, Operate and Transfer) under Government of Pakistan Policy for Power Generation Projects 2002 as adopted in Azad Jammu & Kashmir. The project has the capability of generating an average annual energy of 465 GWh.

== Background and construction ==
Gulpur Hydropower Project is the third independent hydropower project in Pakistan. Korean company has also been awarded other contracts to build hydropower plants in the country on a BOOT basis i.e. under construction 150 MW Patrind Hydropower Plant and 100MW Kotli Hydropower Project.

The sponsor of the project is Korean South East Power Company along with Daelim Industrial Co., Ltd. and Lotte Engineering and Construction Co., Ltd. The Construction of the Project has been awarded to a joint venture between Daelim and Lotte.

Construction of the Gulpur Hydropower Plant commenced in September 2014 and the project is expected to be completed in early 2020. The total cost of the project is about PKR 34 billion. Gulpur Hydropower Project is part of the least-cost energy generation plan of the Government of Pakistan. It is being executed on a priority basis to harness indigenous hydropower resources to improve the ratio of hydel electricity in the national grid and help provide relief to the consumers.

On its completion, the Gulpur Hydropower project will generate about 465 Gwh of inexpensive electricity annually to earn revenue of about Rs 1 billion. Being an environment-friendly hydropower project, it will help reduce dependence on expensive thermal power, thereby saving foreign exchange amounting to $36 million (equivalent to Rs 3 billion) to the country. According to estimation, the Gulpur hydropower project will add about Rs 10 billion per annum to the national economy through socio-economic uplift in the country caused by the project. The Asian Development Bank (ADB) is providing the loan to Mira Power, run by three Korean companies, which will build and operate a 102MW hydropower plant.

== Salient features ==
Basin and Reservoir
◦ Catchment Area 3,625 km^{2}
◦ NHWL EL.540.0m
◦ L.W.L EL.538.0m
◦ 100yr frequency flood 13,340m^{3}/s
◦ PMF 21,640m^{3}/s
◦ Reservoir Capacity(NHWL) 21.893 millionm^{3}

Main Dam
◦ Type CGD
◦ Design Flood 21,640m^{3}/s(PMF)
◦ Height 35.0m
◦ Crest EL.545.0m
◦ Length 238.0m

Spillway
◦ Radial Gate Size W10.0m×7Gates (EL.518.0m)
◦ Under Sluice Gate Size W10.0m×4Gates (EL.515.0m)
◦ Energy Dissipation Submerged Bucket

River Diversion
◦ Type Partial cofferdam(1st) + Sheet File(2nd)
◦ Design Flood 2,517m^{3}/s (25yr frequency)

Intake Weir
◦ Gate Nos. 2 EA
◦ Gate Size 10.0 × 12.0m

Headrace Tunnel
◦ Size D=7.75m
◦ Type Modified horseshoe(Concrete lined)
◦ Length 3,063.5m

Surge Tank
◦ Type Simple Type
◦ Size D=29.0m(Circular)
◦ Height 54.0m
◦ Max Upsurging Level EL.556.523m
◦ Max Downsurging Level EL.525.986m

Vertical Pressure Tunnel
◦ Type Circular (Concrete Lined)
◦ Length 44.6m

Horizontal Pressure Tunnel
◦ Type Circular (Concrete Lined)
◦ Length 71.7m

Steel Penstock
◦ Type Circular (Steel Lined)
◦ Length 11.2m × 1EA 28.9m × 3EA

Powerhouse
◦ Size W74.0m × L31.5m
◦ Turbine Type Francis
◦ Installed Net Capacity 100 MW
◦ Annual Generation 465 GWh
◦ Plant Discharge 194m^{3}/s
◦ Gross head 57.45 m

Tailrace Channel
◦ Type Open Channel
◦ Length 50.0m
◦ Width 45.0m

== Tariff ==
The project was established on a cost-plus basis with a US cents 9.7994/ kWh levelized tariff for 30 years and the hydrological risk will be borne by the purchaser i.e. Central Power Purchasing Agency (CPPA).

== See also ==
- List of dams and reservoirs in Pakistan
- List of power stations in Pakistan
- Satpara Dam
- Allai Khwar Hydropower Project
- Gomal Zam Dam
