= Nandipur Hydropower Plant =

Gujranwala Hydropower Plant Nandipur
- Interactive map of Gujranwala Hydropower Plant Nandipur
- Official name: Nandipur Hydropower Project
- Location: Gujranwala, Punjab, Pakistan
- Status: Operational
- Opening date: March 1963
- Owner: Water and Power Development Authority (WAPDA)

Dam and spillways
- Type of dam: run-of-the-river
- Impounds: Upper Chenab Canal

Nandipur Hydroelectric Plant
- Coordinates: 32°14′34″N 74°15′51″E
- Operator: WAPDA
- Commission date: March 1963
- Type: hydroelectric power plant
- Turbines: 3 × 4.6 MW
- Installed capacity: 13.8 MW
- Annual generation: 33.66 million units (GWh)

Nandipur Hydropower Plant (NHPP) is a small, low-head, run-of-the-river hydroelectric power generation station of 13.8 megawatt generation capacity (three units of 4.6 MW each), located at Nandipur near Gujranwala, Punjab province of Pakistan, on the flows of Upper Chenab Canal. It is located at 32°90'0N 74°11' 0E. It is a small hydel power generating plant constructed and put in commercial operation in March 1963 with the Average Annual generating capacity of 33.66 million units (GWh) of least expensive electricity.

== See also ==
- List of dams and reservoirs in Pakistan
- List of power stations in Pakistan
- Khan Khwar Hydropower Project
- Duber Khwar hydropower project
