= Kurram =

Kurram (Urdu: کُرم) can refer to:

- Kurram River, a river on the border between Afghanistan and Pakistan
- Kurram Valley, the valley of the Kurram River which runs from Afghanistan to the Indus River
- Kurram District, a district in Pakistan
