= Jamshoro (disambiguation) =

Jamshoro is a city in Pakistan.

Jamshoro may also refer to:

- Jamshoro District, an administrative unit of Sindh, Pakistan
- Jamshoro Power Station, a power station in Pakistan
- Jamshoro railway station, a railway station in Pakistan
