= Sahiwal Coal Power Project =

Coal power plant in Punjab, Pakistan

- Location of the Sahiwal Coal Power Project
- Official name: Sahiwal Coal Power Project
- Country: Pakistan
- Location: Sahiwal, Punjab
- Coordinates: 30°42′55″N 73°14′20″E
- Status: Operational
- Construction began: July 31, 2015
- Commission date: 12 May 2017
- Construction cost: $1.91 billion USD
- Owners: Huaneng Shandong and Shandong Ruyi

Thermal power station
- Primary fuel: Bituminous coal

Power generation
- Nameplate capacity: 1,320 MW

External links
- Website: www.chng.com.cn/eng/

The Sahiwal Coal Power Project is a coal power plant project located in the province of Punjab in Pakistan by the name of Huaneng Shandong Ruyi (Pakistan) Energy (Limited). It has an installed capacity of 1320 MW. It commenced full operations on 3 July 2017.

== Project details ==
The power plant is located about 19.3 km from Sahiwal and 22.5 km from Okara cantonment, just north of the road which connects the two towns, in Pakistan's Punjab Province.

The power plant is Pakistan's first supercritical coal power plant, and consists of two 660-megawatt (890,000 hp) plants for a combined capacity of 1,320 MW. This is the first phase, and may be followed by a possible second phase which will include two 1,000-megawatt (1,300,000 hp) plants.

Though the plant is now considered to be part of the China Pakistan Economic Corridor (CPEC) which was announced in April 2015, the symbolic ground breaking for the project actually preceded the announcement of CPEC and took place in May 2014, as the government of Punjab in March 2014 invited bids for the construction of two 660MW power plants in order to help alleviate Pakistan's energy shortfalls.

The plant was built by a joint consortium of China's state-owned China Huaneng Group which will own 51% of shares, and the Shandong Ruyi, which will hold 49% of shares. The Government of Pakistan will purchase electricity from the consortium at a tariff of 8.3601 US Cents/kWh. The project was built on a build, operate, transfer basis in which the plant's ownership will be transferred to the Government of Punjab after 30 years of operation.

The project site spans a total of 690 hectares (1,700 acres), given by the Government of Punjab free of charge. The project includes the construction of a railway siding from the village of Yusuf Wala to the site for exclusive use of the plant.

The plants each consist of one boiler, steam turbine and generator, and are fueled by sub-bituminous coal which will be offloaded at the project's purpose-built rail terminus. The plants generate a total of 1,320 megawatts of electricity, with a gross efficiency of 42.11% by the use of a supercritical steam generator operating at temperatures of up to 580 degrees Celsius.

The plant includes an air quality monitoring system(Flue Gas Desulfurization), and an electrostatic precipitator in order to reduce ash and sulfur emissions from the plant. It requires 60,000 cubic meters of water daily for operation, with water being drawn from the Lower Bari Doab Canal. Raw materials for the plant, including cement, sand, wood, and other buildings materials are being sourced from Pakistan, while furniture from the plants is being procured specifically from markets in nearby Sahiwal.

== Construction ==
While symbolic ground breaking for the project took place in May 2014, commencement of actual civil works began on July 31, 2015. The first of the two 660MW plants was put into operation on May 12, 2017, while the second 660MW plant was put into operation on May 24, 2017. An estimated 350 personnel are required to operate the plant, including 200 Pakistani engineers who are to undergo training in China. Approximately 3000 laborers are required for construction of the plant.

Boiler foundations, and the plant's turbine steel structure have been completed, while the 9-storey tall boiler structure, chimneys, and cooling towers are under construction as of May 2016. In order to transport coal, a purpose-built railway line will be built from the Pakistan Railway at Yusuf Wala to the power plant itself. From there, the coal is to be transported via the purpose-built railway line. In order to assist in coal transportation, Pakistan Railways has signed a $214 million contract for the purchase of 55 diesel electric locomotives from General Electric. Pakistan Railways will also procure a further 20 diesel electric locomotives specifically for coal transport. In January 2016, the Pakistan Railways signed a $37 million contract with Jinan Railway Vehicles Equipment Company for the supply of 800 hopper wagons which will be used to transport coal to the Sahiwal Coal Power Plant; 580 of these wagons are to be constructed at the Mughalpura railway workshop.

In order to connect the plant to the national electrical grid, a 9.5 kilometer 500 kilovolt single circuit transmission line will be constructed from the site to the Sahiwal Substation.

== Coal Source ==
As with the Pakistan Port Qasim Power Project, most of the coal used for the power plant is imported from Indonesia and South Africa, and is transported by rail from the Port of Karachi and Port Qasim in Pakistan's Sindh Province to the nearby village of Yusuf Wala on Pakistan's existing railway infrastructure.

An estimated 4.48 million tons of coal will be required annually for the plant, based on a calculation of 22 hours of power generation per day. Indonesia is identified as a primary source for its high quality coal, reliable production, and short transit times to Pakistan. Coal from Pakistan's own Thar coalfield was found to contain excessive amounts of sulfur and lime, and was not deemed to be of high enough quality for the project. The supply of reliable coal from the fields was also considered to be inadequate. A mixture of Pakistani indigenous coal with imported coal was also deemed to be unsuitable as it would decrease heat production from coal, and would compromise safety of the boilers which are to be used in the project.

== Financing ==
The project is expected to cost a total of $1.8 billion. Of this, the Chinese consortium bore 20% of the cost ($356.4 million) while the remaining 80% ($1.4256 billion) was financed by a loan from the Industrial and Commercial Bank of China.

== Tariff ==
The Government of Pakistan will purchase electricity from the plant at a tariff of 8.3601 US Cents/kWh.

== Is Sahiwal a suitable site for this project? ==
The Sahiwal power plant has been proven to be one of the most costly mistakes borne by the Government of Pakistan, both economically and environmentally. The plant is powered by imported coal, which means the coal must first be unloaded at the docks at either Karachi Port or Gwadar and then transported all the way to Sahiwal, making the unit cost of electricity production extremely high. This has led to accusations of corruption, alleging a potential loss of roughly 81 billion PKR to the national exchequer. Furthermore, the environmental impact has also been significant; not only was the local population displaced, but the plant has also been cited as a major contributor to declining air quality, the erosion of fertile land due to coal ash, and water contamination. All these issues raise serious questions regarding the feasibility of the plant’s location and cast a shadow over the potential benefits that were announced by the Ministry of Power at the time. Moreover, there are speculations that the plant may eventually be closed due to the unit cost of electricity becoming unsustainable.

- List of power stations in Pakistan
