= Nandipur =

Nandipur نندی پور
- Town
- Location in Pakistan
- Coordinates: 32.2556°N 74.2653°E
- Country: Pakistan
- Province: Punjab
- District: Gujranwala
- Elevation: 230 m (750 ft)
- Time zone: UTC+5 (PKT)

Nandipur Urdu: نندی پور, romanized: Nandīpūr is a town located in the Gujranwala District of the Punjab province in Pakistan. It is situated approximately 10 kilometers from the city of Gujranwala and is recognized for its industrial significance, particularly in the energy sector.

== Geography ==
Nandipur lies at an elevation of approximately 230 meters (755 feet) above sea level. The town is positioned at coordinates 32.2556°N latitude and 74.2653°E longitude. It is surrounded by several nearby settlements, including Nizampur and Gagewali.

== Infrastructure ==
The town is notable for housing major energy projects:

- Nandipur Power Project: A combined cycle thermal power plant with a capacity of 425 megawatts (MW), expandable up to 525 MW. Constructed by the China Dongfang Electric Corporation, the project was completed in March 2015.
- Nandipur Hydropower Plant: Located on the Upper Chenab Canal, this facility contributes to the region's renewable energy supply.

Additionally, the area hosts the Hydraulic Research Center, which spans 100 acres and focuses on hydrology and related studies.

== Cricket Pitch Soil ==
Nandipur is nationally and internationally recognized for its unique clay soil, which is extensively used in the construction of cricket pitches across Pakistan and abroad. The soil, often referred to as "black soil," has a high clay content (up to 60%), making it ideal for creating fast, bouncy, and durable wickets.

This clay has been used in major Pakistani stadiums including:

- National Stadium, Karachi
- Gaddafi Stadium, Lahore
- Rawalpindi Cricket Stadium

It has also been exported to:

- Sharjah Cricket Stadium
- Dubai Cricket Stadium
- Sheikh Zayed Cricket Stadium, Abu Dhabi

A notable example of its use was during the 2004 India vs Pakistan Test match at Rawalpindi, where the pitch was built using Nandipur clay.

== See also ==
- Nandipur Power Project
- Nandipur Hydropower Plant
