= Haveli Bahadur Shah =

- Town Of Qureshi Clan
- Location within Pakistan
- Coordinates: 30°04′38″N 72°11′11″E
- Country: Pakistan
- Province: Punjab
- District: Jhang
- Time zone: UTC+5 (PST)

Haveli Bahadur Shah is a town situated in Jhang, Punjab, Pakistan. It is located at 31°4'N 72°11'E at an elevation of 150 metres (490 ft).

The town is the site of the RLNG-based Haveli Bahadur Shah Power Plant.
