= Uch Power Plant =

Pakistani cycle power plant

Uch Power Plant I & II
- Country: Pakistan
- Location: Dera Murad Jamali
- Coordinates: 28°34′58″N 68°10′42″E
- Status: Uch-I operational since 2000, Uch-II operational since April 2014
- Construction began: 1996
- Commission date: 2000
- Owners: Sapphire Fibres (50%); Mindbridge (50%)

Thermal power station
- Primary fuel: Natural gas
- Secondary fuel: Fuel Oil
- Combined cycle?: Yes

Power generation
- Make and model: GE
- Nameplate capacity: Uch-I 596 MW, Uch-II 404 MW

External links
- Website: www.gdfsuez.com/en/group/governance/operational-organization/energy-international/

Uch Power Plant is a combined cycle power plant, located in Dera Murad Jamali, Nasirabad District, Baluchistan, Pakistan. It has three GE frame 9E gas turbines, three Deltak HRSGs and one GE steam turbine which can generate an output of 560 MW.

The plant is owned by Pakistani textile company, Sapphire Fibres and business process outsourcing company, Mindbridge.

== Uch-II Power Plant ==
Uch-II is a 404 MW gas-fired combined cycle power plant in Balochistan Province, Pakistan.

Uch II uses the supply of indigenous gas in the Uch gas field. Uch I is also using the gas from UGF. It was built at a cost of $500 million, with IFC investment of up to $100 million.

== See also ==
- List of power stations in Pakistan
