= Kurram Garhi =

- Village
- Location within Khyber Pakhtunkhwa Location within Pakistan
- Coordinates: 33.030250°N 70.526373°E
- Country: Pakistan
- Province: Khyber Pakhtunkhwa
- Division: Bannu
- District: Bannu

Kurram Garhi is a small village located near the city of Bannu, in Khyber Pakhtunkhwa province of Pakistan. Its population is approximately 35,000. Barren hills are near this village. The village is on the border with Kurram District. Other nearby villages are Peppal, Surwangi, and Amandi Kala.

== Culture ==
The people of Kurram Garhi wear Shalwar-Kameez regional dress, with different designs for women. They construct houses of mud. All the people eat regional food like Dodi, Saag and other vegetables. They also eat fish, chicken, beef and mutton. They drink Lassi, the region's most energetic drink.

== Amenities ==
=== Hydel powerhouse ===
In the neighbourhood is located the 4 megawatts (5,400 hp) Kurram Garhi Hydropower Plant. Four turbines are installed on the Kachkot canal that originates from the Kurram River. This powerhouse produces electricity for the people of this village as well as also for other nearby villages. The station began operating in February 1958 with Average Annual generating capacity of 17 million units (GWh) of least expensive electricity.

=== Filtration plant ===
In the vicinity of the village is a big water treatment plant that purifies water from the Kurram River. The water is purified for the whole village. The pure water then flows from Kurram Garhi to Bannu (approximately 25 kilometres (16 mi)). The pure water is stored in a huge tank located in Tanchi Bazar.

=== Graveyard ===
Kurram Garhi contains a large graveyard which is used by the neighbouring villages. Graves may be 20 to 25 feet (6.1 to 7.6 m) long. The graves are at Baba Sahab.
