= Khurmana River =

Physical characteristics
- Mouth
  - coordinates: 33.709255°N 70.326289°E

The Khurmana River is a river in Pakistan. It is a tributary of the Kurram River, which is in turn a tributary of the Indus River, joining the right bank of the Indus near Isa Khel.
