= Port Qasim Power Project =

Pakistani coal powered plant

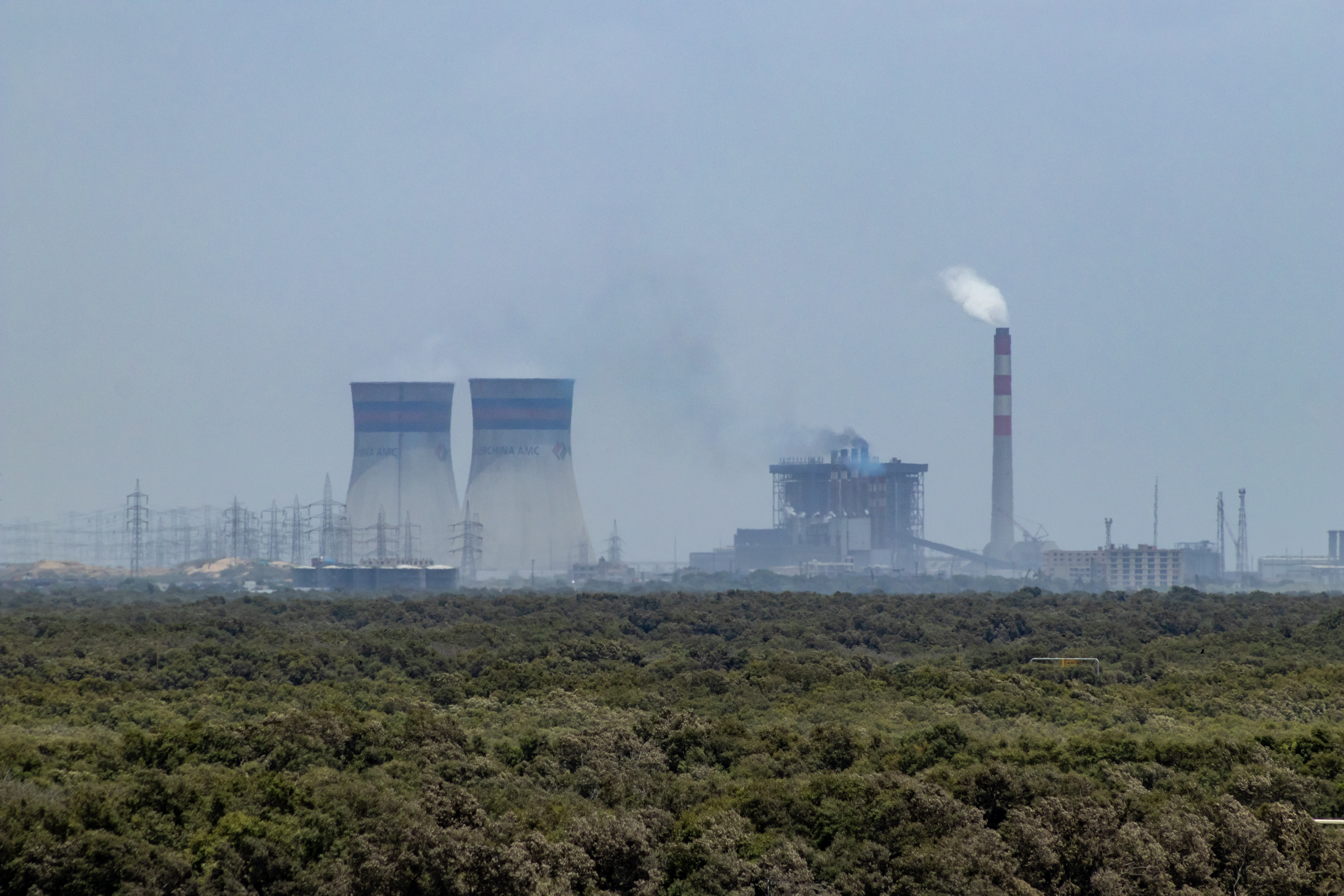
- Location of the Port Qasim Power Project in Sindh province.
- Country: Pakistan
- Location: Port Qasim, Sindh
- Coordinates: 24.7854°N 67.3695°E
- Status: Operational
- Construction began: May 2015
- Commission date: Dec 2017
- Construction cost: $1.91 billion USD
- Owners: Port Qasim Energy Holding and Sinohydro Resources Limited

Thermal power station
- Primary fuel: Bituminous coal

Power generation
- Nameplate capacity: 1,320 MW

The 1,320 megawatt Port Qasim Power Project comprises two 660 megawatt supercritical coal power plants, one of which was inaugurated in December 2016 as part of the China–Pakistan Economic Corridor. The $2.09 billion project is located on 330.7 acres at Port Qasim, 37 kilometers east of Karachi in Sindh Province. The project is part of a group of 14 energy projects which fall under the fast-tracked "Early Harvest" program of the $46 billion China Pakistan Economic Corridor project.

The plants were built on a "Build-Own-Operate" basis, and were constructed and will be operated by the Port Qasim Energy Holding, a firm jointly financed by Qatar's Al-Mirqab Capital and China's Power Construction Corporation, a subsidiary of Sinohydro Resources Limited.

== Project Details ==
The project consists not only of the power plants themselves, but also will include the construction of a jetty for exclusive use of the power plant for coal importation. The estimated annual coal consumption for the plants will be 4.66 million tons, and enough annual power for an estimated 3-4 million households will be generated.

The plants each consist of one boiler, steam turbine and generator, and are fueled by sub-bituminous coal which is offloaded at the project's coal jetty. Electricity will be connected to the electric grid network K-Electric via a 500 kilovolt AC transmission line. The plant's gross efficiency is equal to or greater than 41%, while the net efficiency is equal to or greater than 38%.

Additionally, living quarters for up to 700 full-time workers were constructed at the site, with additional temporary housing facilities for 11,000 construction workers divided into a unit for 2,000 Chinese construction workers, and another unit for 9,000 Pakistani construction workers, with all construction materials for living quarters provided by Chinese manufacturers.

== Coal Source ==
Most of the coal used for the power plant will be imported from Indonesia, with South Africa and Australia identified as suitable supplemental suppliers. Indonesia is identified as a primary source for its high quality coal, reliable production, and short transit times to Pakistan.

Coal from Pakistan's own Thar coalfield was found to contain excessive amounts of sulfur and lime, and was not deemed to be of high enough quality for the project. The supply of reliable coal from the fields was also considered to be inadequate. Mixture of Pakistani indigenous coal with imported coal was also deemed to be unsuitable as it would decrease heat production from coal, and would compromise safety of the boilers which are to be used in the project.

== Construction and Operation ==
Construction commenced in May 2015, and the first unit inaugurated in December 2017. The plants were built on a "Build-Own-Operate" basis, and is to be operated by the Port Qasim Energy Holding, a firm jointly financed by Qatar's Al-Mirqab Capital and China's Power Construction Corporation, a subsidiary of Sinohydro Resources Limited.

== Financing ==
Al-Mirqab Capital will own a 49% stake in the project, and while Power Construction Corporation, which will own a 51% stake in the project. The individual companies will invest $521 million, while the Exim Bank of China will lend those companies the remaining $1.56 billion required for construction.

== Tariff ==
The Government of Pakistan will be contractually obliged to purchase electricity from the plants for thirty years at a cost of 8.12 US cents per unit.

== Commissioned ==
In November 2017, the first 660MW unit of the power plant was synchronised to the national grid. The power plant was completed and commenced full operations on 25 April 2018.

== See also ==
- List of power stations in Pakistan
