= Balloki Power Plant =

Natural gas power plant in Punjab, Pakistan

- Official name: Balloki Power Plant
- Country: Pakistan
- Location: Balloki, Chunian, Punjab
- Coordinates: 31.1887°N 73.8895°E
- Status: Operational
- Construction began: November 2015
- Commission date: 2018
- Construction cost: $570.87 million
- Owners: National Power Parks Management Company Pvt. Ltd (EPC: Harbin Electric International Company Limited)

Thermal power station
- Primary fuel: Liquefied natural gas
- Combined cycle?: Yes

Power generation
- Nameplate capacity: 1,223 MW

External links
- Website: nppmcl.com

The Balloki Power Plant is a 1,223 MW natural gas power plant completed in mid 2018 in Pattoki, in the Punjab province of Pakistan. Groundbreaking was commenced on November 11, 2015, and construction was scheduled for completion by December 2017. The project utilizes regasified liquefied natural gas (RLNG) for fuel, with diesel as an alternate backup. A 40 kilometer long transmission line with a capacity of 500 kilovolts was also constructed between the new plant and a grid station in southern Lahore.

Bidding was open to international firms for the 82 billion rupee project. China's Harbin Electric Company was announced as the lowest evaluated bidder for the project on October 2, 2015, having offered a levelized electricity cost of 7.973 cents per unit, outbidding the Turkish conglomerate Enka İnşaat ve Sanayi A.Ş. and GE Consortium which both stood in second with 8.185 cents per unit tariff, followed by China Machinery Eng Co (CMEC) & SEFC at 8.304 cents, and Hyundai Engineering at 8.332 cents per unit.

== Project Financing ==
Plans for the project call for private sector investment to construct the plant, with the private company then selling electricity to the government of Pakistan at pre-negotiated rates. It is not financed under CPEC projects. As the project is to be constructed largely by the private sector, financing loans for the project do not fall under the concessionary loan agreement which finances CPEC projects, but it will still qualify for subsidized loans with an interest rate of 5% which are to be dispersed by the Exim Bank of China. For comparison, loans for previous Pakistani infrastructure projects financed by the World Bank carried an interest rate between 5% and 8.5%, while interest rates on market loans approach 12%.

== Project Troubles ==
Along with its sister Bhikki plant, the site faces issues with power generation. The Chief Justice of Pakistan (CJP) was given notice of zero power generation by the plants and issued investigations. In November 2019, then PM of Pakistan Imran Khan wished to privatize the Balloki power plant along with a few others.

== See also ==
- List of power stations in Pakistan
- List of barrages and headworks in Pakistan
- Head Balloki
