= Jamshoro Power Station =

Thermal power plant in Sindh, Pakistan

Jamshoro Thermal Power Station
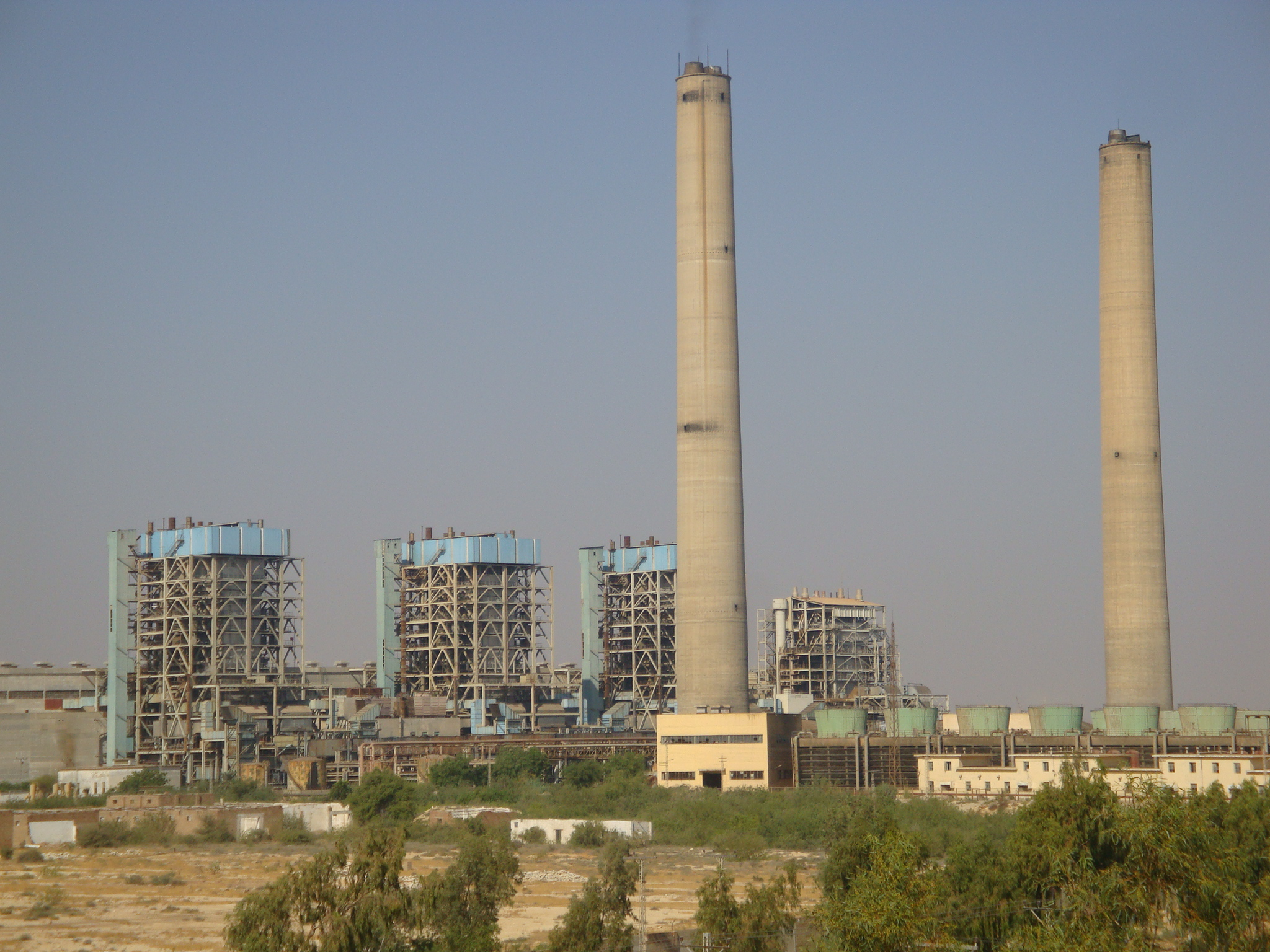
- Location of Jamshoro Power Station in Pakistan
- Official name: TPS Jamshoro
- Country: Pakistan
- Coordinates: 25°28′20″N 68°15′58″E
- Status: Operational
- Commission date: Unit 1: January 1990; Unit 2: December 1989; Unit 3: June 1990; Unit 4: January 1991; Unit 5: 2023 (projected); Unit 6: 2029 (projected)
- Construction cost: Unit 5-6: US$1.5 billion
- Owner: Government of Pakistan
- Operator: WAPDA

Thermal power station
- Primary fuel: Unit 1: Furnace Oil; Unit 2-4: Gas/Furnace Oil; Unit 5-6: Coal
- Cooling source: Indus River

Power generation
- Units operational: 1 x 250 MW; 3 x 210 MW
- Make and model: Unit 1: Mitsui Engineering & Shipbuilding; Unit 2-4: Harbin; Unit 5-6: Siemens-Harbin JV
- Units under const.: 2 x 660 MW
- Nameplate capacity: 880 MW (operational); 2,200 MW (planned)

External links
- Website: www.jpcl.com.pk
- Commons: Related media on Commons

Jamshoro Thermal Power Station also known by other names such as GENCO-I, and TPS Jamshoro is a gas / furnace oil and coal based thermal power plant with a total installed capacity of 880 MW located in Jamshoro near Hyderabad, Sindh in Pakistan. It is operated by the Jamshoro Power Company. The first phase of the project was commissioned between 1989 and 1991. It consists of one 250 MW unit and three 210 MW units. The power station is undergoing a planned expansion with additional 2 x 660 MW coal fired units. One 660 MW unit has been constructed and is ready for commissioning. Site preparation of second 660 MW unit is in progress with an expected commissioning date of July 2029.

In February 2014, the Asian Development Bank agreed to loan $900m to the government of Pakistan for a project to install 2 x 660MW supercritical coal-fired power plant at Jamshoro. The Islamic Development Bank (IDB) approved $220m for the Jamshoro Coal Power generation project. The Asian Development Bank had already approved $900m for the project, whereas $380m was to be contributed by the government to meet the overall estimated project cost of $1.5 billion.

The new 2 x 660 MW units will be supercritical coal-fired power plants. Unit 5 of 660 MW will be using an 80/20 blend of imported sub-bituminous coal (80%) and domestic lignite (20%) from Thar coalfield. Unit 6 will be based on 100% domestic lignite.

== See also ==
- List of power stations in Pakistan
- List of electric supply companies in Pakistan
