= Haveli Bahadur Shah Power Plant =

RLNG based power plant in Punjab, Pakistan

- Country: Pakistan
- Location: Haveli Bahadur Shah, Jhang District, Punjab
- Coordinates: 31°04′04″N 72°11′11″E
- Status: Operational
- Commission date: 2018
- Owner: National Power Parks Management Company (NPPMCL)

Thermal power station
- Primary fuel: RLNG
- Combined cycle?: Yes

Power generation
- Nameplate capacity: 1,230 MW

Haveli Bahadur Shah Power Plant is an RLNG-based power plant located in the town of Haveli Bahadur Shah, in Jhang District of Punjab, Pakistan. It was commissioned in May 2018.
