= Shadiwal =

Pakistani village

Coordinates: 32°51′14.3″N 74°03′54.1″E

Shadiwal شادیوال
- Interactive map of Shadiwal
- Country: Pakistan
- Province: Punjab
- District: Gujrat
- Time zone: UTC+5 (PST)
- Calling code: 053

Shadiwal (Urdu: شادیوال) is a city in Gujrat District in the Punjab province of Pakistan. It is situated between the rivers Chenab and Jhelum. It was a small village at the end of last century but is now a developed town with a town committee. The development of Shadiwal began with the construction of a power plant on the Upper Jhelum Canal during the 1960s.
