= Kurram River =

River in Afghanistan and Pakistan

Kurram
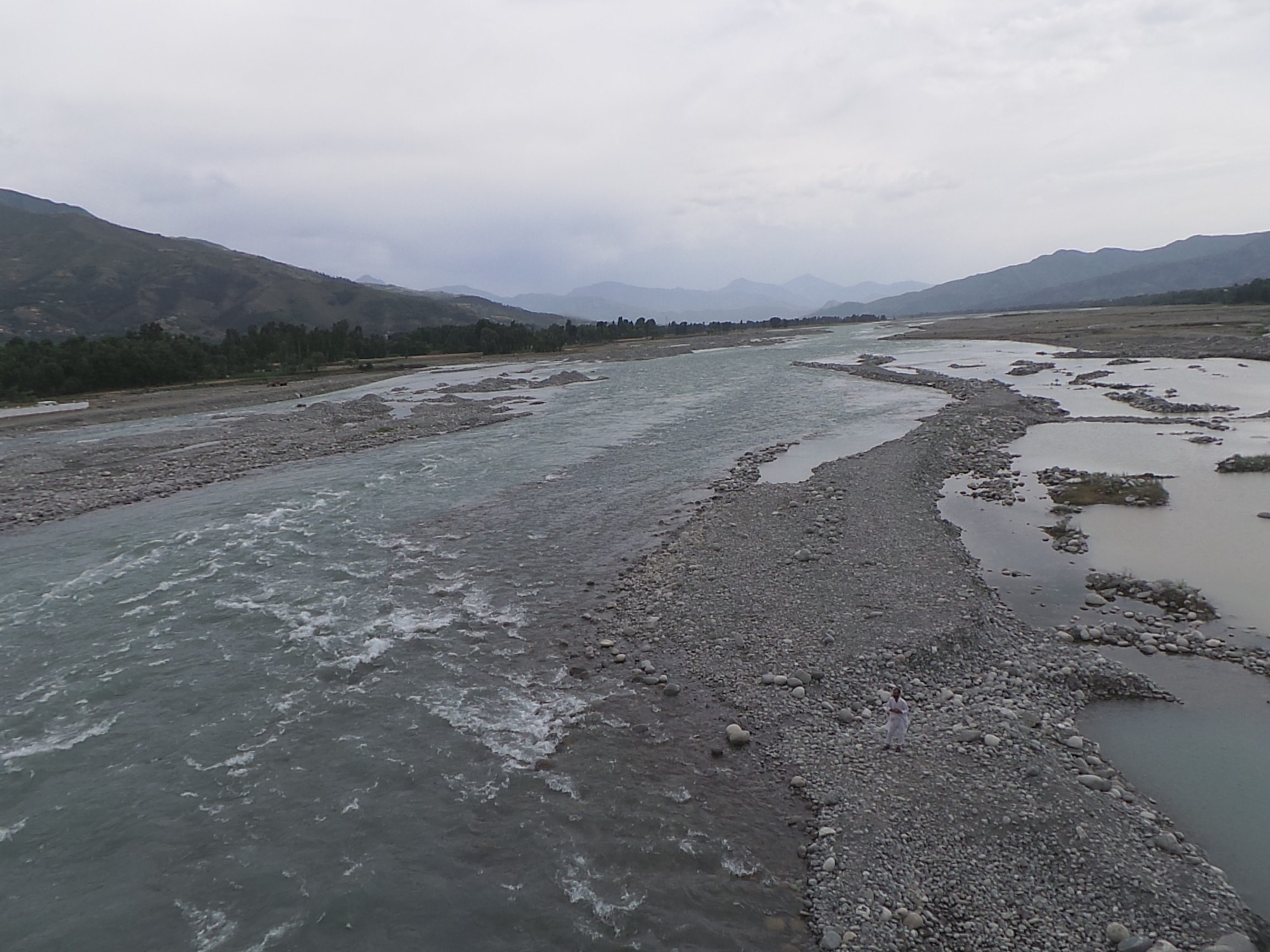

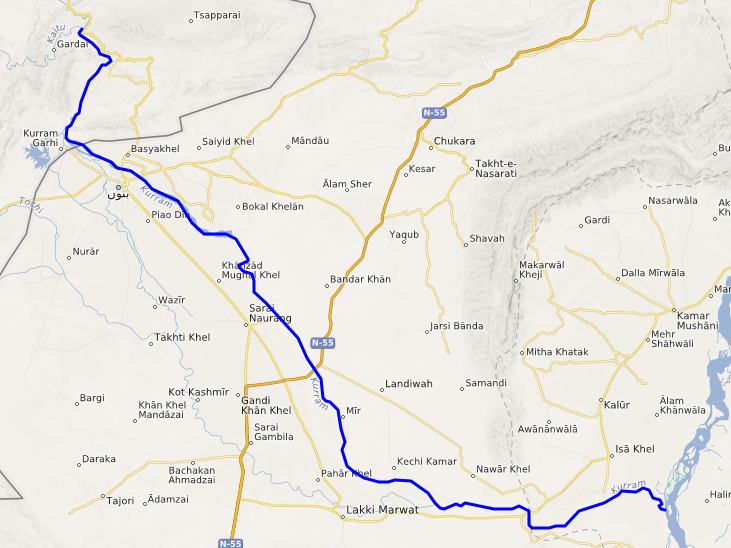
- Course of the Kurrama River
- Native name: د کورمې سيند (Pashto)

Location
- Country: Pakistan
- Province: Khyber Pakhtunkhwa
- Region: Kurram Agency

Physical characteristics
- Source
  - location: 20 km (12 mi) southeast of Gardez, Paktia
- Mouth: Indus River
  - location: near Isa Khel
  - coordinates: 32°37′36″N 71°21′53″E
- Length: 320 km (200 mi)

Basin features
- Progression: Indus→ Arabian Sea
- Tributaries
  - right: Gambila

The Kurram River (Pashto: د کورمې سيند) or Kurrama River, originates from the watershed of Safed Koh region in the Paktia province of Afghanistan and the Kurram District of Pakistan. It flows through North Waziristan, and the city of Bannu, before joining the Indus River near Isa Khel. It drains the southern flanks of the Safed Koh mountain range and is a right-bank tributary of the Indus.

Kurram River mainly passes through the southern Tribal Areas of Khyber Pakhtunkhwa. It irrigates around 32,000 hectares (80,000 acres) of land.

Its tributaries include the Kirman and the Khurmana rivers.

The nearby Kurram-Garhi project, finished in 1962, provides flood control and is used for irrigation and power generation. The soil around Kurram river is very suitable for agriculture. It contains living properties and is subject to flood in some season.

== Topography ==
Generally, the topography of the catchment area of the Kurram River is mountainous in the upper reaches near Ali Khayl, Mirazi Kalay, Peer Kalai, Kharlachi, Parachinar and Thal areas. Near Bannu city, the river flattens up and follows a consistent mild slope up to its outfall in to the Indus River near Isa Khel. The elevations ranging from about 4750 m to 200 m and sloping northwest–southeast. Most of the flat terraces available along the river are utilized for agriculture for which water from the river is utilised. Moreover, there exist a number of irrigation canals and civil channels on overtaking from the river.

== See also ==
- Kurram Valley
- Bannu District
- Ghoriwala
- Isakhel
