= Khan Khwar Hydropower Plant =

Dam in Pakistan

- Location within Pakistan
- Official name: Khan Khwar Hydropower Plant
- Location: Besham, Shangla, Pakistan
- Coordinates: 34°54′19.21″N 072°48′41.55″E
- Status: Operational
- Construction began: April 2003
- Opening date: 14 July 2012
- Owner: Water and Power Development Authority (WAPDA)

Dam and spillways
- Type of dam: RCC
- Impounds: Khan Khwar River
- Height: 46 m (151 ft)
- Length: 112 m (367 ft)

Power Station
- Turbines: 2 x 34 MW (46,000 hp) Francis-type, 1 x 4 MW (5,400 hp)
- Installed capacity: 72 MW (97,000 hp)
- Annual generation: 595 GWh

The Khan Khwar Hydropower Plant is a run-of-the-river project located near the town of Besham in the Shangla District of the Khyber Pakhtunkhwa province of Pakistan. It is situated on the Khan Khwar River, a right bank tributary of the Indus River. It is approximately 265 km from the federal capital of Islamabad and 350 km from the provincial capital of Peshawar.

The total electricity generation capacity of the Khan Khwar project is 72 megawatts (97,000 hp). There are two vertical Francis turbine units of 34 MW and one unit of 4 MW installed at the Khan Khwar Hydroelectric Station, with an average annual generation capacity of 595 million units (GWh) of cheap electricity. These turbines are manufactured by the Dongfang Electric Machinery Co. Ltd. The project was completed by the technical assistance of Chinese corporations (Sinohydro Corporation via a consortium with China Water Resources Beifang Investigation, Design and Research Co. Ltd).

Construction of the Khan Khwar Hydropower Plant commenced in April, 2003, and was completed in April, 2012. The power house commenced commercial operations in November, 2010. The project was officially inaugurated on the 14 July, 2012, by the then Prime Minister of Pakistan Raja Pervez Ashraf. The total cost of the project was about PKR 10.73 billion, out of which PKR 5.049 billion accounted for the foreign exchange component.

Dam:
Type: RCC
Length: 112 m.
Height: 46 m.
Design discharge: 29 cusecs
Design head: 244 m.

== See also ==
- List of dams and reservoirs in Pakistan
- List of power stations in Pakistan
- Satpara Dam
- Allai Khwar Hydropower Project
- Gomal Zam Dam
