= Duber Khwar Hydroelectric Plant =

Hydroelectric power station in Khyber Pakhtunkhwa, Pakistan

Duber Khwar Hydropower Plant
- Location within Pakistan
- Official name: Duber Khwar Hydropower Plant
- Location: Pattan, Kohistan, KPK, Pakistan
- Coordinates: 35°7′9.82″N 072°55′38.51″E
- Status: Operational
- Construction began: June 2003
- Opening date: June 2013
- Owner: Water and Power Development Authority (WAPDA)

Dam and spillways
- Type of dam: Gravity, roller-compacted concrete
- Impounds: Duber Khwar River
- Height: 40.5 m (133 ft)
- Length: 202 m (663 ft)

Duber Khwar Hydroelectric Plant
- Coordinates: 35°6′17.98″N 72°59′39.02″E
- Operator: WAPDA
- Commission date: January 2014
- Turbines: 2 x 65 MW Pelton-type
- Installed capacity: 130 MW
- Annual generation: 595GWh

The Duber Khwar Hydropower Plant is located near the town of Pattan in Kohistan, Khyber Pakhtunkhwa, Pakistan on the Duber Khwar River, a right bank tributary of the Indus River. It is approximately 340 km NW from Islamabad, the federal capital of Pakistan.

The total electricity generation capacity of the Duber Khwar project is 130 MW. There are two vertical Pelton wheel turbine units of 65 MW installed at the Duber Khwar Hydroelectric Station. These turbines are manufactured by Andritz Hydro Austria. Andritz Hydro Austria supplied and installed the complete electro-mechanical equipment and services with a focus on its "water to wire" concept. The supplies consisted of two 65 MW Pelton-type turbines with a rated head of 516 m, associated generators and generator auxiliaries and the complete electrical power systems.

Construction of the Duber Khwar Hydropower Plant commenced in June 2003, and the project was completed in June 2013. The plant began commercial operations in January 2014. The total cost of the project was about PKR 16.325 billion. At its completion, the Duber Khwar hydropower project was projected to generate 595 million units of low-cost hydel electricity per annum.

== Dam ==
Type: Concrete gravity dam
Length: 202 m.
Height: 40.5 m.
Design Discharge: 29 cusecs
Headrace tunnel length: 4.873 km
Design head: 535 m.

== See also ==
- Allai Khwar Hydropower Plant
- Gomal Zam Dam
- List of dams and reservoirs in Pakistan
- List of power stations in Pakistan
- Satpara Dam
