= Allai Khwar Hydropower Plant =

Dam in Khyber Pakhtunkhwa, Pakistan

- Location within Pakistan
- Official name: Allai Khwar Hydropower Plant
- Location: Allai, Battagram, Khyber Pakhtunkhwa
- Coordinates: 34°51′30.85″N 073°01′15.58″E
- Status: Operational
- Construction began: January 2005 (completed on 4 March 2013)
- Opening date: 25 March 2012
- Owner: Water and Power Development Authority (WAPDA)

Dam and spillways
- Type of dam: RCC
- Impounds: Allai Khwar River
- Height: 51 m (167 ft)
- Length: 88 m (289 ft)

Power Station
- Commission date: 2012
- Hydraulic head: 687 m (2,254 ft)
- Turbines: 2 x 60.5 MW Pelton-type
- Installed capacity: 121 MW
- Annual generation: 463 million units (GWh)

The Allai Khwar Hydropower Plant is a run-of-the-river, high head project of 687 metres, located in the Battagram District on the Allai Khwar River, a left bank tributary of the Indus River in Khyber Pakhtunkhwa province, Pakistan. It is approximately 245 km from the federal capital of Islamabad and 330 km from the provincial capital of Peshawar.

The total electricity generation capacity of the Allai Khwar Plant is 121 MW. There are two Pelton-type turbine based electricity generating units of 60.5 MW installed at the Allai Khwar Hydroelectric Station, with a total average annual generation yield of 463 million units (GWh) of least expensive electricity. The project was completed by the technical assistance of international corporations via a consortium between local and Chinese firms headed by Dongfang Electric, which was responsible for the civil works. The E&M works were carried out by Andritz Hydro GmbH Austria. The transmission line was laid by the North East China Electric Power Corporation with the assistance of a local firm, Imperial Construction Company (ICC) from Lahore.

== Financing ==
The Islamic Development Bank (IDB) provided a loan of US$38.435 million from July 2009 onwards to complete the remaining works on the project. The total cost of the project is estimated to be PKR 13.8 billion. The annual benefits of the project are estimated to be around PKR 4.5 billions.

== Construction ==
Construction of the Khan Khwar Hydropower Plant commenced in January 2005, and the project was completed in March 2013. The power house went into commercial operation on 25 March 2010. The project was officially inaugurated on 4 March 2013 by President of Pakistan Asif Ali Zardari. The Chinese firm handed over the project to the Water and Power Development Authority on 8 October 2013.

Dam:
Type: RCC
Length: 88 m.
Height: 51 m.
Design discharge: 29 Cusecs
Design head: 687 m.

== See also ==
- List of dams and reservoirs in Pakistan
- List of power stations in Pakistan
- Khan Khwar Hydropower Project
- Satpara Dam
- Gomal Zam Dam
- Duber Khwar hydropower project
