= Satpara Dam =

Dam in Gilgit-Baltistan, Pakistan

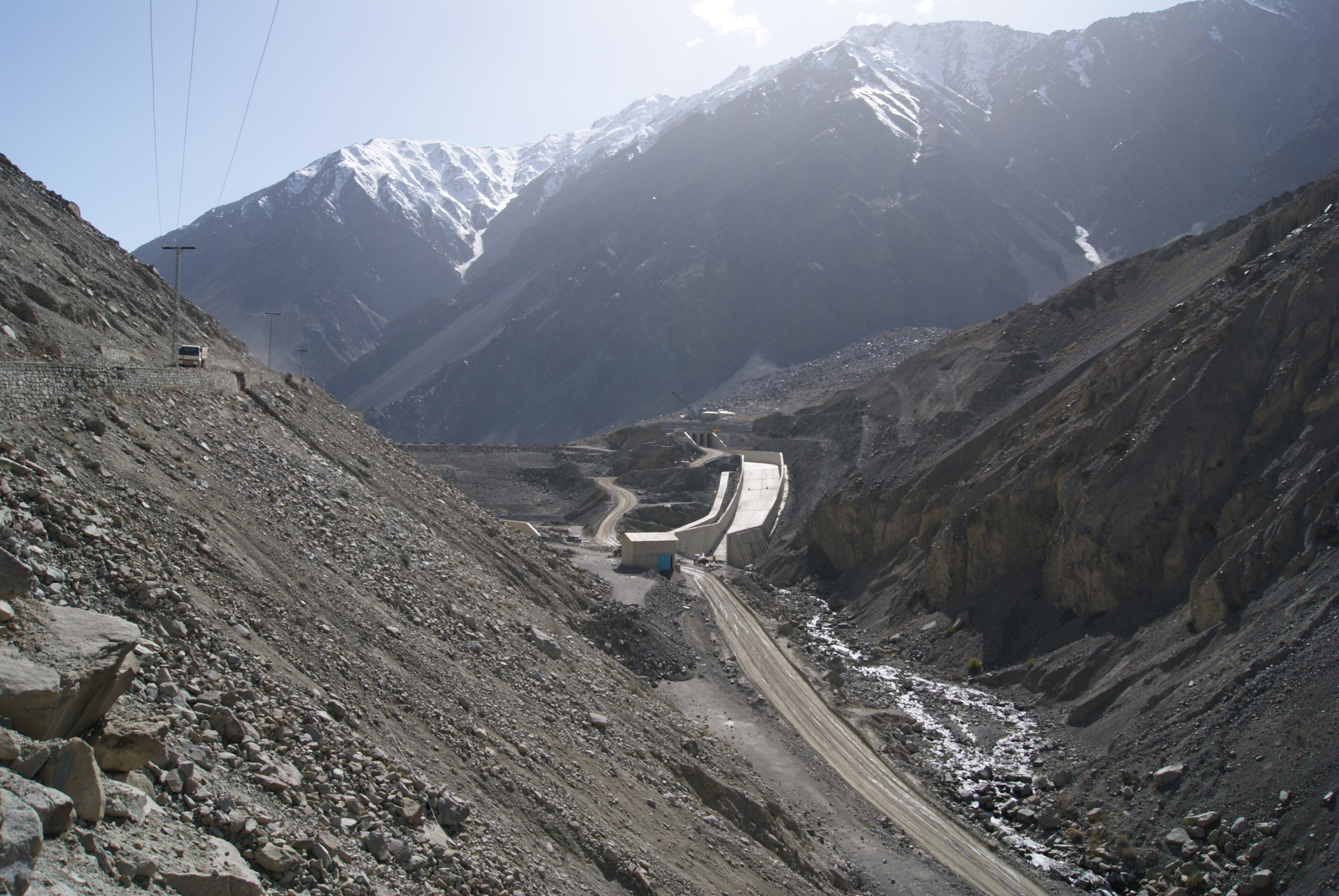
- Satpara Dam

- Location of dam in Gilgit Baltistan, Pakistan Satpara Dam (Pakistan)
- Official name: بند ستپارا
- Location: Skardu, Gilgit-Baltistan, Pakistan
- Coordinates: 35°14′40″N 75°38′15″E
- Status: Operational
- Construction began: April 2009
- Opening date: November 2011
- Owner: Government of Pakistan
- Operator: Water and Power Development Authority (WAPDA)

Dam and spillways
- Type of dam: Concrete-faced earth-filled
- Impounds: Satpara Stream
- Height: 39 m
- Length: 170 m

Reservoir
- Creates: Satpara Lake

Power Station
- Installed capacity: 17.366 MW

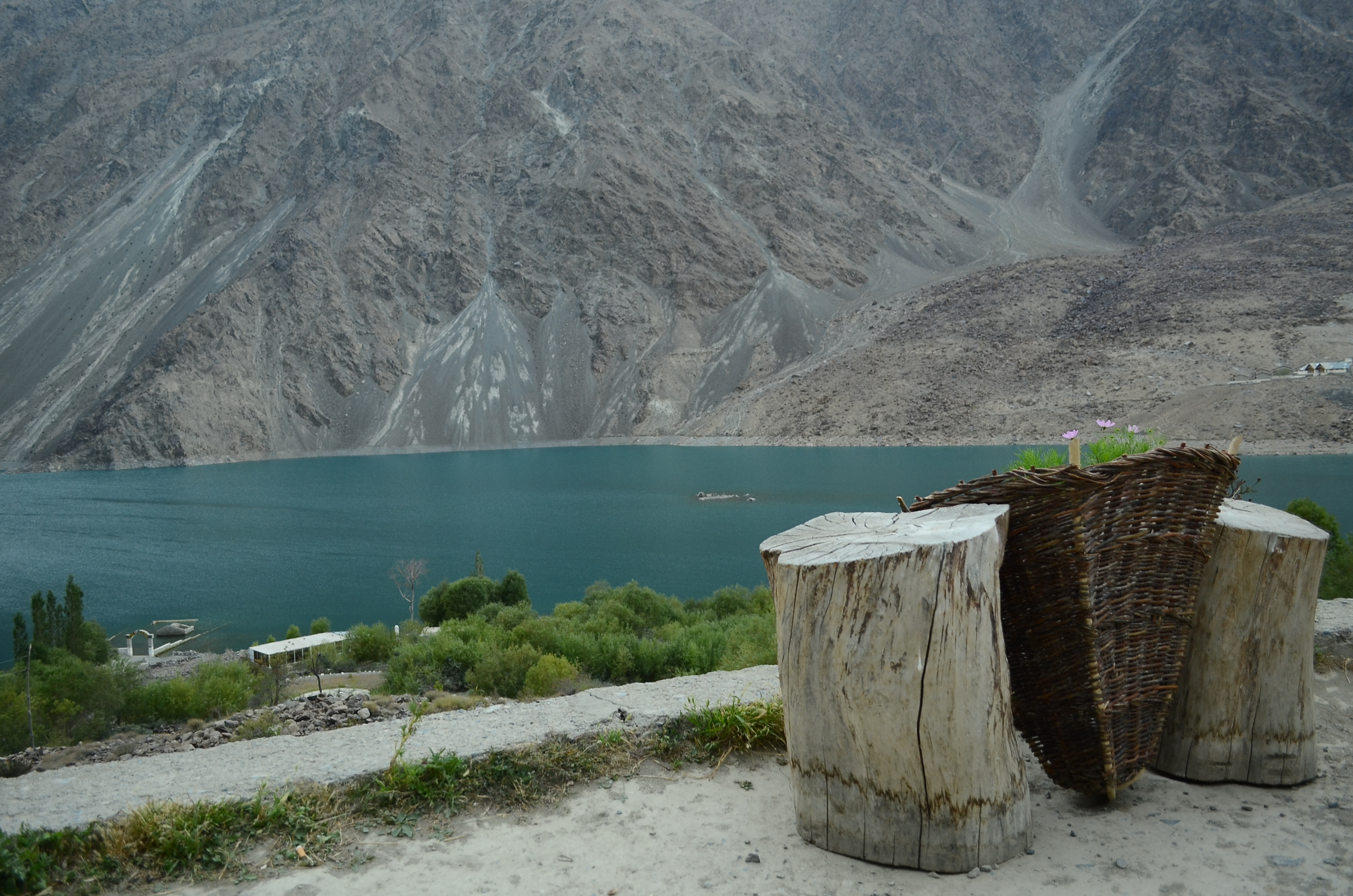
Satpara Lake, Skardu

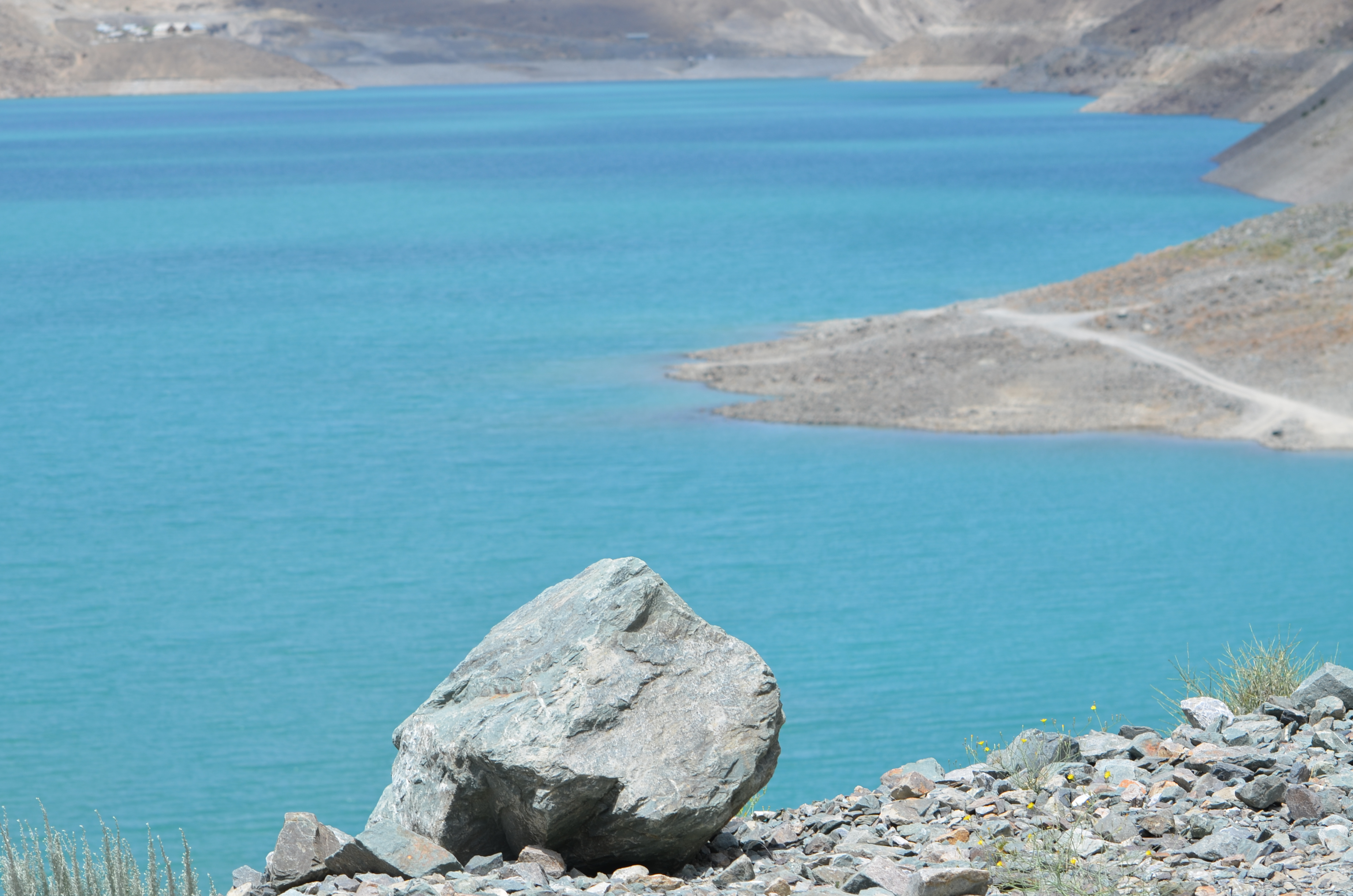
Turquoise water of Satpara lake in Skardu

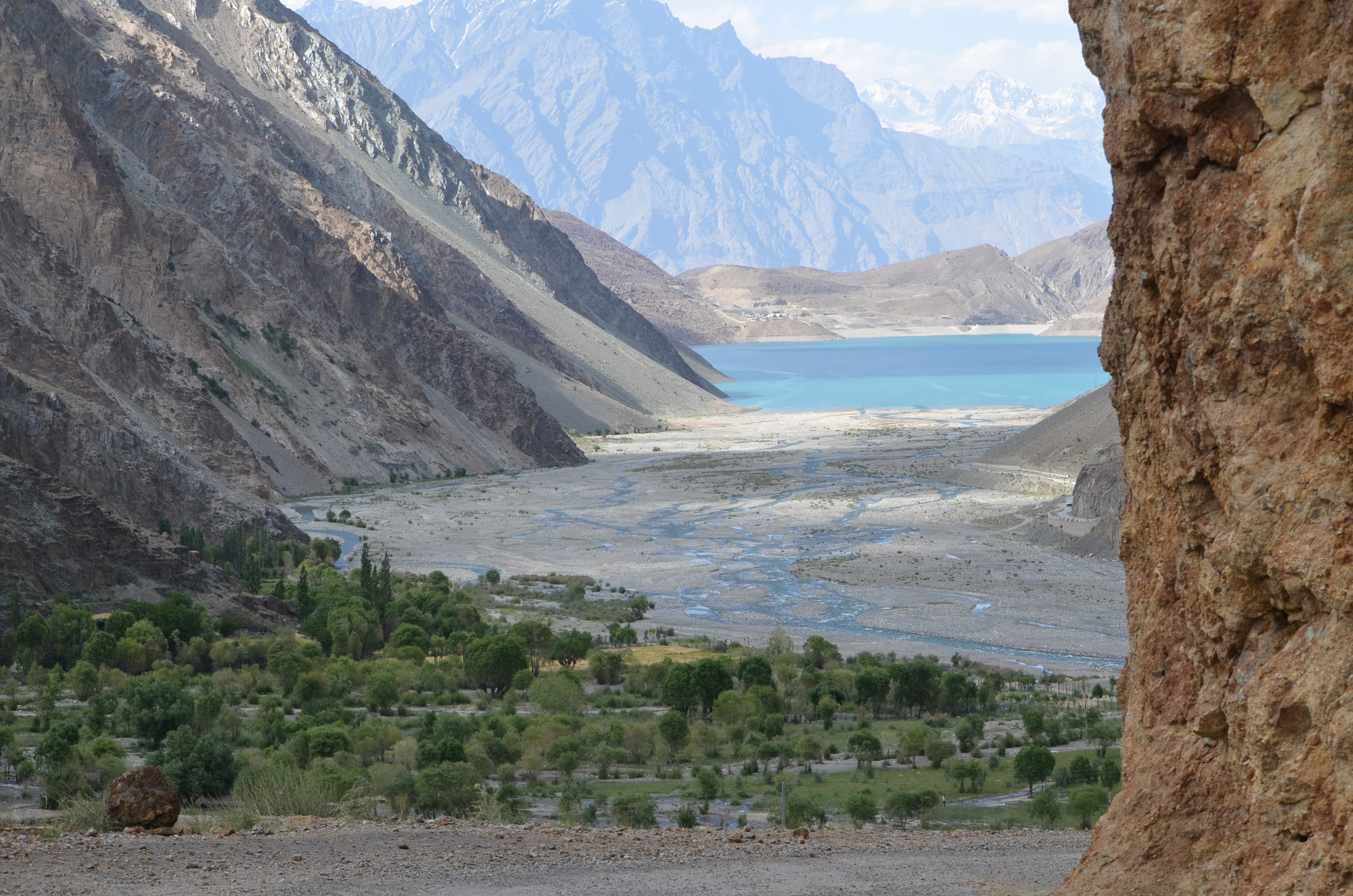
Satpara lake view from village in Skardu

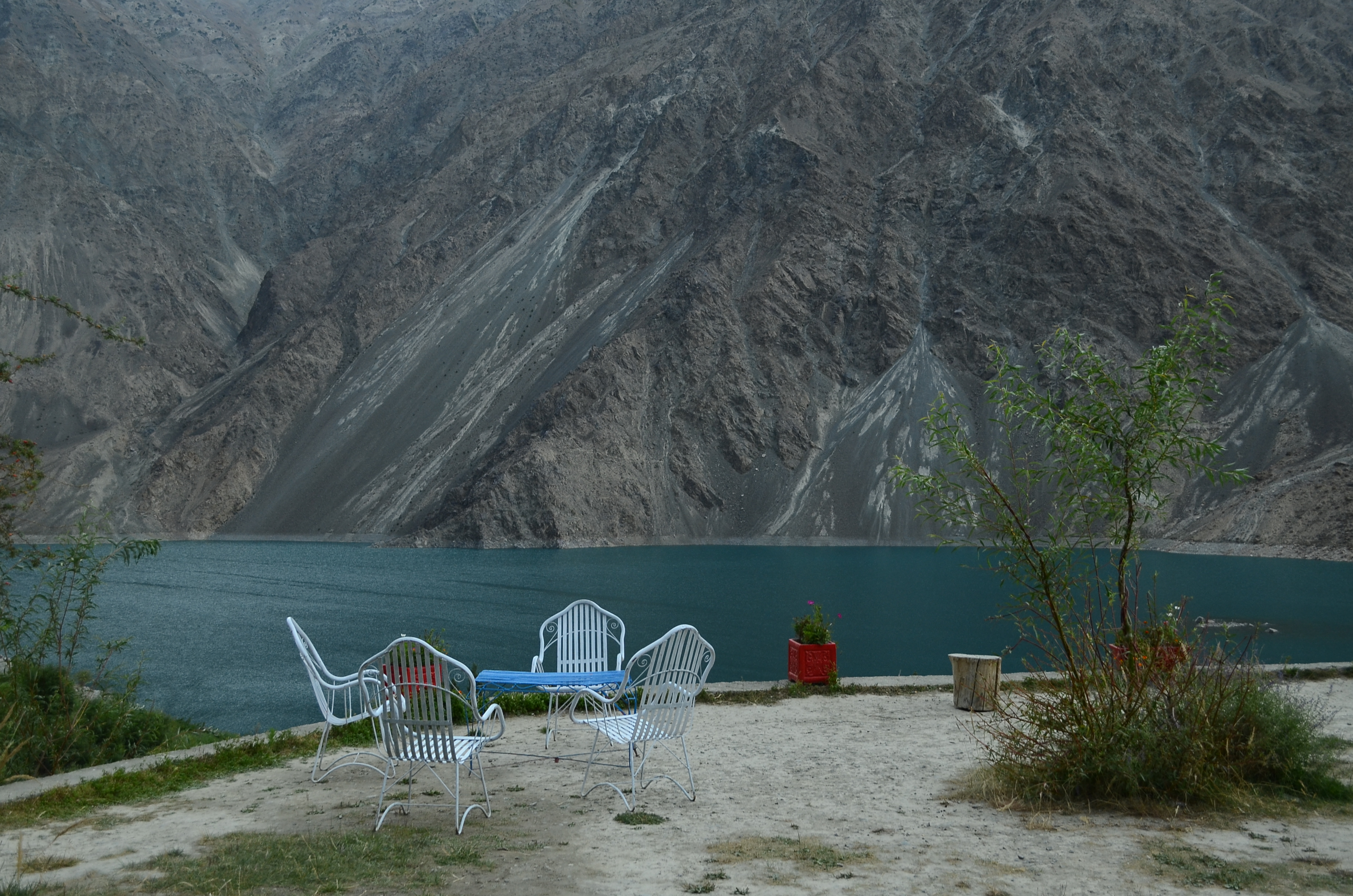
Sadpara Lake Skardu

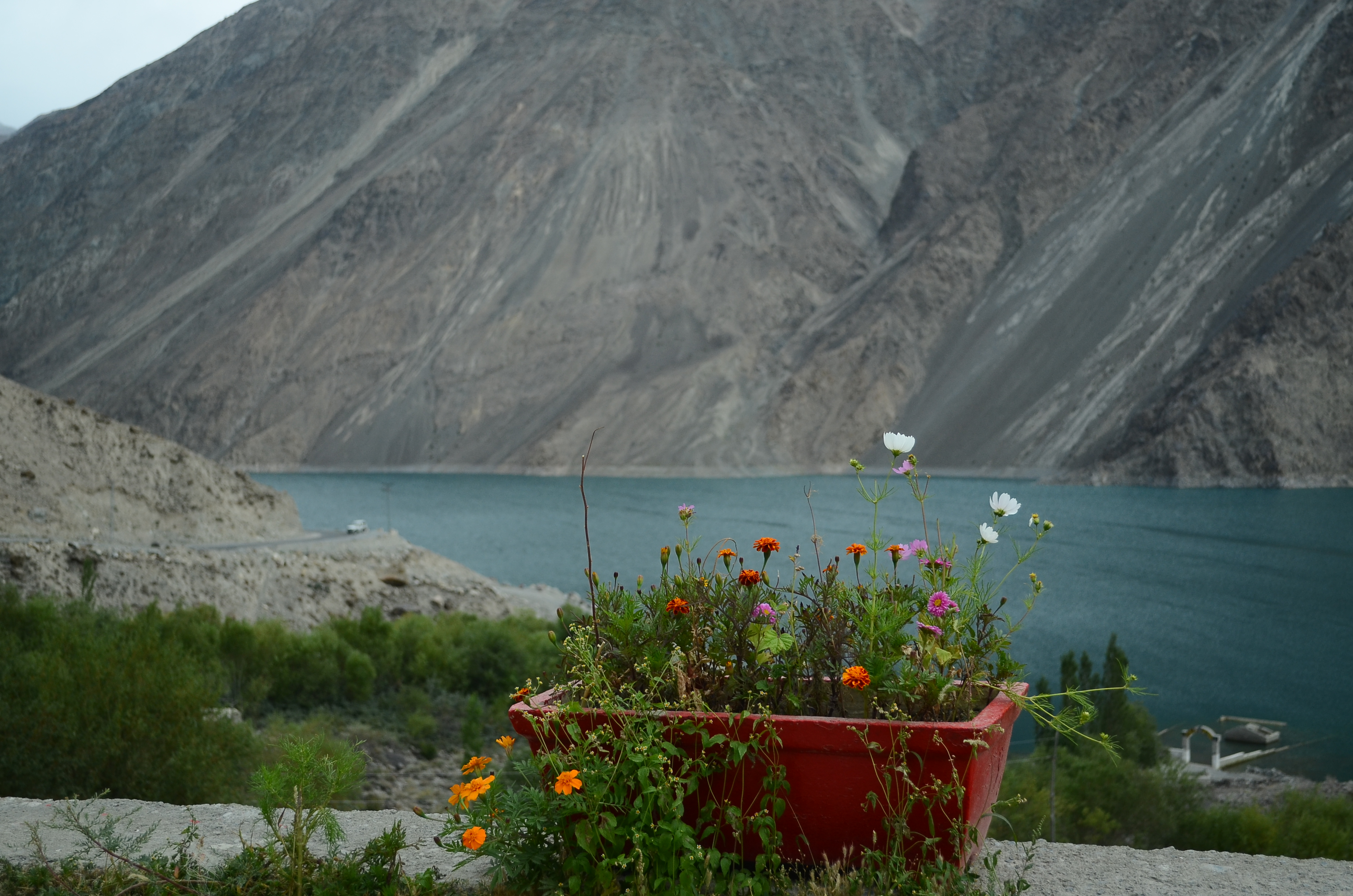
Satpara Lake, Skardu

Satpara Dam is a medium-size multi-purpose concrete-faced earth-filled dam located downstream from Satpara Lake on the Satpara Stream approximately 4 km from the town of Skardu in Gilgit-Baltistan, Pakistan.

The dam has enlarged the size of Satpara Lake, generates 17.36 MW of hydroelectricity, supplies power to approximately 30,000 households in the Skardu Valley, irrigates 62.87 square kilometres (15,536 acres) of land and supplies 3.1 million gallons per day of drinking water to Skardu city. Annual agricultural output in the Skardu Valley is expected to increase more than four-fold, generating about $6 million in additional annual economic benefits to local communities.

Construction of Satpara Dam commenced in April 2003 and completion was scheduled in November 2011. Power House Unit No. 1 came online on 6 October 2007 and Unit No. 2 on 30 December 2008. On 7 January 2011, the Government of Pakistan and the United States Agency for International Development (USAID) entered into an Enhanced Partnership Agreement under which USAID agreed to provide US$26 million for the construction of Power House Units Nos. 3 and 4 and completion of the remaining works on the dam. Power House Unit No. 3 started commercial operation in May 2013 and Unit No. 4 in June 2013.

The dam became operational in April 2013.

== Salient features ==
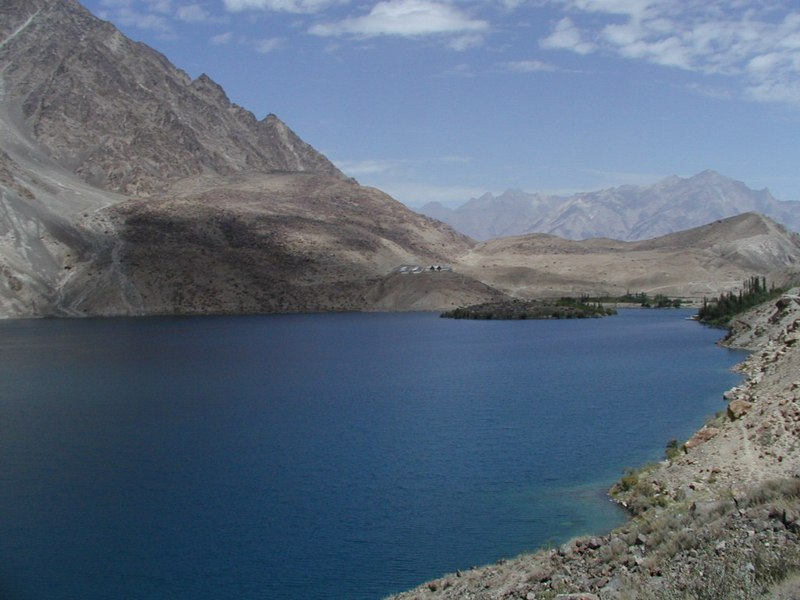
Satpara Lake

Dam:
Type: Earth-filled
Length: 170 m
Height: 39 m
Width (at top): 24.3 m

Spillway:
Spillway length: 327.6 m
Spillway width: 15.2 m
Spillway capacity: 5000 ft 3/s

Reservoir capacity (gross): 0.0932 MAF (93,385 AF)
Reservoir capacity (live): 0.0521 MAF (51,484 AF)
Power generation capacity: 17.366 MW
Irrigation system: LBC 51933 ft., RBC 58000 ft.

Canal Length:
Left Bank Canal: 17983 m
Right Bank Canal : 9144 m

Command Area:
Total: 41.00 km^{2} (10,131 acres)
Left Bank Canal: 32.86 km^{2} (8,119 acres)
Right Bank Canal: 8.14 km^{2} (2,012 acres)

Construction:
Contractor: hi tech lubricants Ltd.
Man-hours: 2.4 million
Peak manpower: 450

== See also ==
- List of dams and reservoirs in Pakistan
- Satpara Lake
- Satpara Stream
- List of power stations in Pakistan
- Allai Khwar Hydropower Project
- Gomal Zam Dam
