= Gomal Zam Dam =

Dam in Khyber Pakhtunkhwa, Pakistan

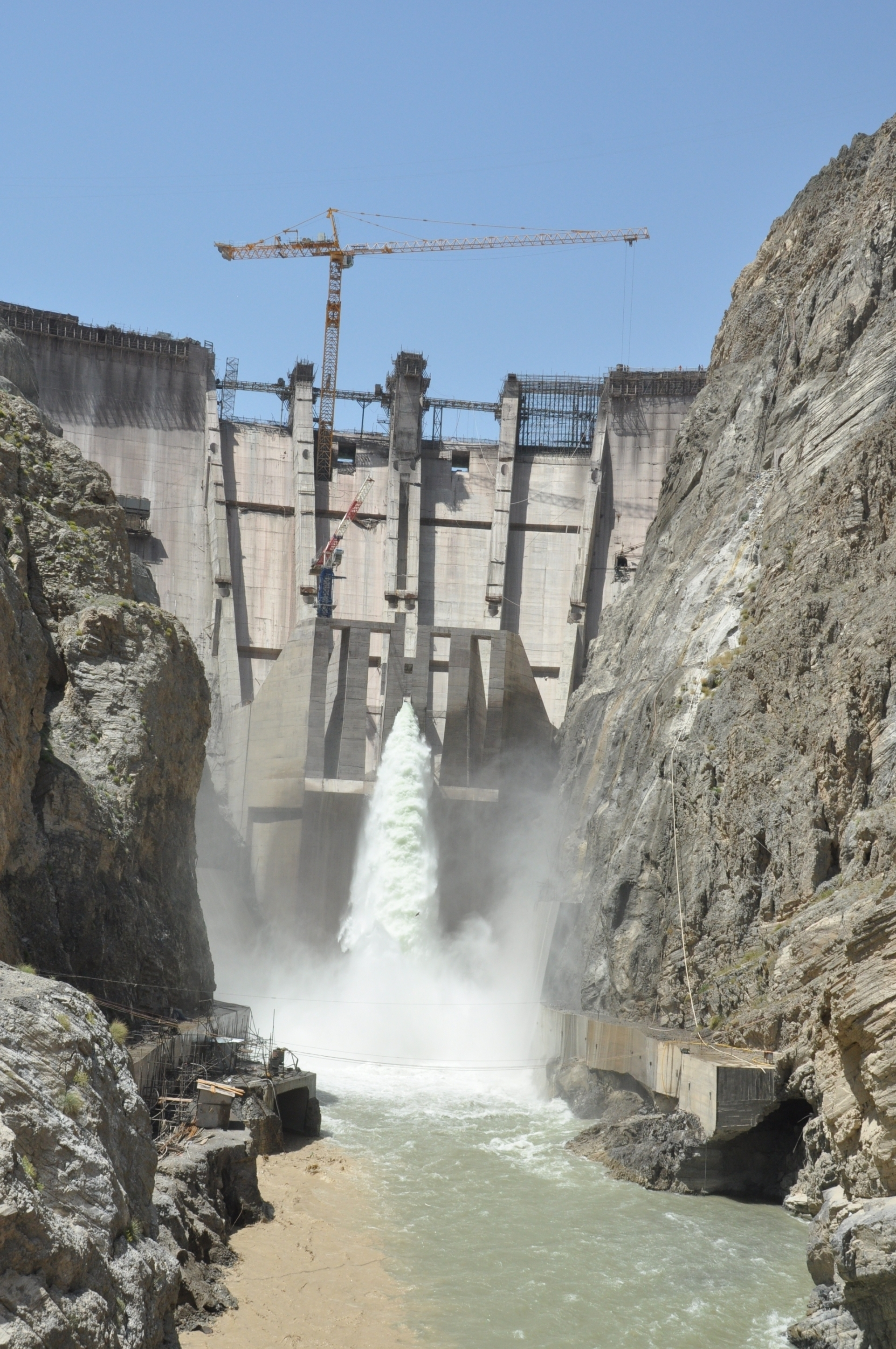
- Construction of the Gomal Zam Dam on 21 April 2011

- Location within FATA Location within Pakistan
- Official name: گومل زم ڈیم
- Location: Khjori Kach, South Waziristan District, Khyber Pakhtunkhwa, Pakistan
- Coordinates: 32°5′55″N 69°52′53″E
- Purpose: Irrigation, power, flood control
- Status: Operational
- Construction began: 2001
- Opening date: 2011
- Owner: Government of Pakistan
- Operator: Water and Power Development Authority (WAPDA)

Dam and spillways
- Type of dam: Curved gravity, roller-compacted concrete
- Impounds: Gomal River
- Height: 133 m
- Length: 231 m

Reservoir
- Total capacity: 1,140,000 acre-feet (1.41 km^{3})
- Active capacity: 890,000 acre-feet (1.10 km^{3})
- Inactive capacity: 250,000 acre-feet (0.31 km^{3})

Power Station
- Commission date: 12 September 2013
- Turbines: 2 x 8.7 MW Francis-type
- Installed capacity: 17.4 MW (max. planned)

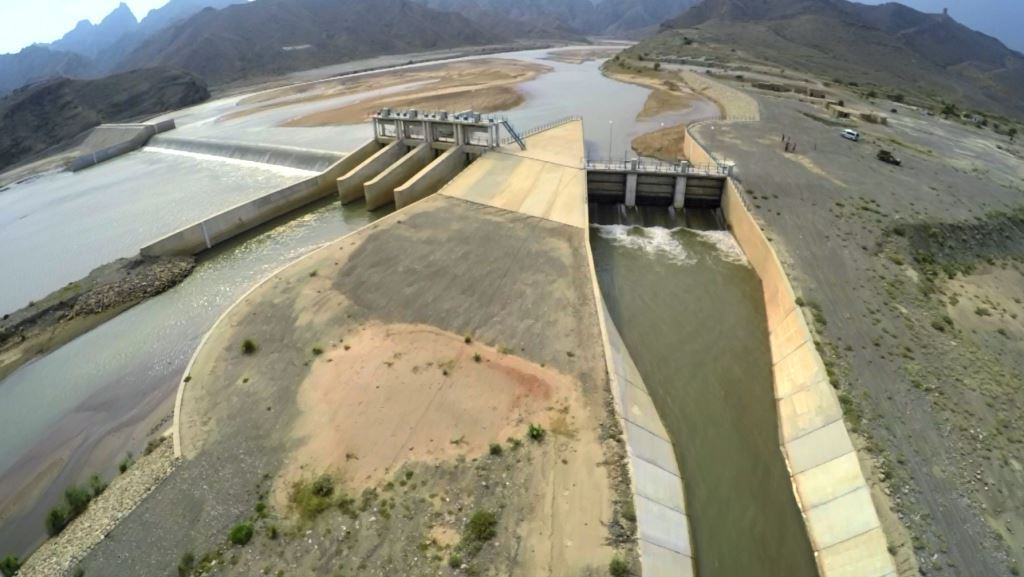
Distribution system of Gomal Zam Dam

Gomal Zam Dam (Urdu: گومل زم ڈیم) is a multi-purpose gravity dam in South Waziristan District of Khyber Pakhtunkhwa, Pakistan. The dam impounds the Gomal River, a tributary of the Indus River, at Khjori Kach, where the Gomal River passes through a narrow ravine. The purpose of the dam is irrigation, flood control, and hydroelectric power generation. Construction of the dam began in August 2001 and was completed in April 2011. The powerhouse was completed in March 2013 and electricity production started in August 2013. The dam was officially inaugurated on 12 September 2013 by Minister for Water and Power Khawaja Muhammad Asif, along with US Ambassador Richard G. Olson and Khyber Pakhtunkhwa Governor Shaukatullah Khan.

== Features ==
Gomal Dam is a roller-compacted concrete (RCC) gravity dam with a height of 133 m. It has a gross storage capacity of 1.41 cubic kilometres (1,140,000 acre⋅ft) and the 60.5 km long main canal can irrigate about 660 square kilometres (163,000 acres) of barren land in Tank district and Tehsil Kulachi of Dera Ismail Khan. It produces 17.4 MW of electricity.

== Background ==
The dam site at Khjori was first envisaged by four British officers of the Royal Corps of Engineers in 1898 and surveys were carried out. The Government of Pakistan approved the construction of the dam in August 1963 and preparatory work was commenced. However, it was stopped due to the outbreak of the 1965 Indo-Pak War and by subsequent budgetary constraints. However, in 2001, then President of Pakistan, General Pervez Musharraf ordered its construction. The groundbreaking ceremony was held on 14 August 2001.

== Finances and construction ==
In 2002, Pakistan's Water and Power Development Authority (WAPDA) hired a Chinese joint venture, CWHEC-HPE, to lead construction at a cost of about Rs. 4.388 billion. The venture joined China National Water Resources & Hydropower Engineering Corporation and Harbin Power Engineering Company. Work halted in October 2004 when two Chinese engineers were kidnapped by Tehrik-i-Taliban Pakistan militants. One was later rescued but the other was killed in the attempt. Work resumed in 2007 after Pakistan put its army's construction branch, the Frontier Works Organisation, in charge. It hired as sub-contractors China's state-owned Sinohydro Corporation to complete the dam, and Turkey's Tekser to finish irrigation works. The total cost of the resumed project was stated to be around Rs. 13 billion.

In July 2010, the United States Agency for International Development (USAID) announced it would provide funding for the dam. Further delay to the project was caused by the 2010 Pakistan floods.

In October 2010, the construction work on the dam was reported to be 92 percent complete. It was also stated to start operating from April 2011.

In January 2011, USAID signed an agreement with WAPDA to provide $40 million to help complete the under-construction Gomal Zam Dam & powerhouse. The first tranche of $20 million was released to WAPDA in February 2011. Another $20 million were provided to complete the main dam and the powerhouse.

Construction of the Dam was completed in April 2011 and filling of the reservoir was started in the same month. Eight more dam workers were kidnapped by Tehrik-i-Taliban Pakistan militants on 15 August 2012. Seven of the eight workers were released on 14 September 2013 after the Pakistani government paid a heavy ransom of Rs. 25 million to the ‘commander Latif’ group of Tehrik-i-Taliban Pakistan. The fate of the eighth kidnapped employee is unknown.

Another $40 million was also provided by the USAID for the completion of the irrigation and flood protection component of the project. In January 2013, the irrigation and flood protection component was stated to be "almost near completion".

The powerhouse was completed in March 2013 and electricity production started in August 2013. The Gomal Zam Dam was officially inaugurated on 12 September 2013.

In 2015, the Ministry of Planning, Development and Reforms reportedly warned Water and Power Development Authority (Wapda) that the operating life of the Gomal Zam Dam was on the decline at an alarming rate due to silting. According to estimates published in year 2016, the 3% sediment to water ratio in the Gomal River makes it the second heaviest sediment laden river in the world, and it will therefore take 11 years to tax fully the dead storage capacity and about 70 years to fill the whole reservoir thus ending its life [reference: Hazrat Hussain & al., Vol. 4 No. 1 (2016) Sarhad University International Journal of Basic and Applied Sciences].

=== Waran Canal System ===
On 12 September 2012, WAPDA and USAID signed an agreement for the construction of the Waran Canal System in Tank district of Khyber Pakhtunkhwa province. Under the agreement, USAID will provide $12 million in funding for construction of the 164 km-long Waran Canal system to bring 11,000 hectares (28,000 acres) of barren land under permanent irrigation. In January 2013, WAPDA started the construction of Waran Canal System as an integral component of the Gomal Zam Dam project. On completion, the canal will irrigate 11,000 hectares (28,000 acres)of land in the district which would increase crop sowing in the area from 26 percent to 87 percent and harvesting intensity from 9 percent to 80 percent. The Waran Canal, in addition to Gomal Zam Dam's main canal, will bring a total of 77,000 hectares (191,000 acres) land under permanent irrigation in Dera Ismail Khan & Tank districts of Khyber Pakhtunkhwa province. It is very unfortunate that to-date the irrigation channel has not yet started working. Due to the high level of negligence on the part of concerned authorities the canal is yet to start. From 2012 till 2019 it's almost 7 years that the canal has been delayed for various reasons. Agriculture Engineer Engr. Salah Ud Din explained that the project has been delayed due to the following key reasons which should be addressed as soon as possible for the early completion of the project.

The implementation of both sophisticated Canal Irrigation Systems as well as allowing Rodh Kohi flooding into modern or under established and under construction WCs i.e.

Non-segregation of primitive Rodh Kohi flood and modern / sophisticated Canal Irrigation system.

Check damming in Rods and flood diversions to WCs (Under Progress / Completed sites),

Eventually damages to WCs due to Rodh Kohi flooding,

·Non-cooperation of farmers / not letting field teams for constructions on WCs & road sites.

Moreover, the following Rodh Kohi Nullahs are directly hitting the WCs of GZD-CADP;

Gomal Nullah, Rodh Looni, Korr Nullah, Sharrana I, Sharrana II, Kala Pani Rodh of Rori, Kala Pani Kot Zafar Baladasti

Way out: Clear-cut segregation of sophisticated canal irrigation system and primitive Rod-Kohi Nullahs. Complete ban on check damming / flooding, diversion of flood on watercourse sites, Illegal cuts, pipes, siphon tubes, and heavy machinery crossings. Enlistment and to work out the deprived farmers from canal irrigation system by a joint team of Revenue and Irrigation Departments. To address the issue on technical basis and arrangement of irrigation / water system on sustainable engineering grounds/ parameters. In case of unavoidable circumstances, a joint irrigation / regulation system to apply the minimum amount of water to avoid damages to watercourses and the canal irrigation system. As well as identification of sites to install the underground pipes (as a cross drainage structure) to pass on flood water across the watercourse/Distributary/Minor sites. District administrative support to convince farmers to allow for working tracks (along with open drain on both sides) of watercourse pads. This is the final way out to complete the tertiary / watercourse irrigation system under GZD-CADP. The land that is to be irrigated by Waran Canal is fertile enough not to cater only to the need of food of the local area but rather will contribute to the national exchequer. District Tank is one of the most backward districts of KP and even the people have an acute problem of access to clean drinking water and the operationalization of the Waran Canal indirectly contributes to the need of safe drinking water by rising the under ground water table. All concerns and especially the minister for water and power and the PM are requested to give special attention to Waran Canal and ensure its operation at the soonest time.

== See also ==
- List of dams and reservoirs in Pakistan
- List of power stations in Pakistan
- Satpara Dam
- Khan Khwar Hydropower Project
- Allai Khwar Hydropower Project
