= Dadhocha Dam =

- Location: Dadhocha, Rawalpindi, Pakistan
- Purpose: Water supply
- Status: Under Construction
- Construction cost: 7 billion

Dadhocha Dam is a dam currently under construction being built near Dadhocha village in Rawalpindi, Pakistan. The dam is intended to address the water scarcity issues in Rawalpindi and Islamabad.

The storage capacity of the dam is 60,000 acre-feet, with a dead level of 15,000 acre-feet. It is considered crucial to fulfill the water needs of Rawalpindi and its neighboring areas. It is anticipated that the dam will provide a daily supply of 25 million gallons of water exclusively to Rawalpindi.

== History ==
The dam was initially proposed in 2001 and after a long wait has commenced construction starting in the year 2024. Estimated cost of the dam is 7 billion. The reservoir will provide 24 million gallons of water to Rawalpindi on a daily basis. In 2020, the contract for the construction work was awarded to the Frontier Works Organisation (FWO), a commercial division associated with the Pak army. The estimated cost for the dam construction amounts to Rs7 billion, and the project is expected to be finished within a three-year timeframe.

== Controversies ==
- On 3 August 2015, a report was submitted to the Supreme Court on behalf of the Punjab Irrigation Department. The submitted report assured the Supreme Court that the Dam would be built at the original site. The original site of Dadhocha Dam had been included in the master plan of DHA Valley, Islamabad. On 27 January 2016, the district administration of Rawalpindi told the Punjab Irrigation Department to start constructing the stalled Dadhocha Dam to end its tussle with the Defence, Islamabad-Rawalpindi.
- In January 2021, individuals affected by the dam project conducted a public gathering and a peaceful march to express their concerns regarding displacement without proper rehabilitation. They demanded a significant rise in the compensation rate for their lands and the development of a resettlement plan.
