= Dadhocha =

- Village
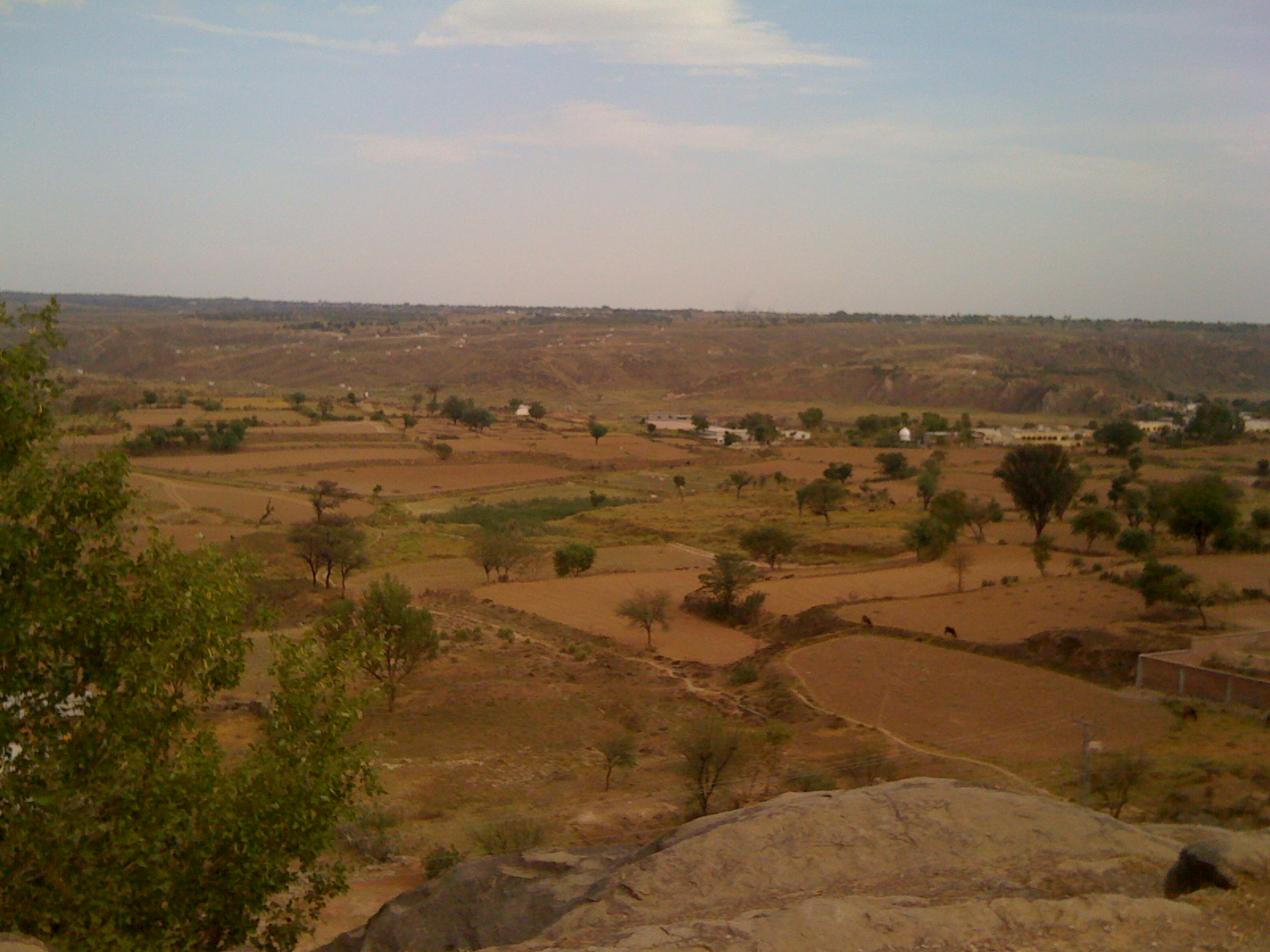
- Bird's-eye view of Dadhocha
- Country: Pakistan
- Province: Punjab
- District: Rawalpindi
- Time zone: UTC+5 (PST)

Dadhocha is a small village in Rawalpindi district of Punjab, Pakistan. Gakhars (Kayani) are a majority clan but village also houses a large number from Janjua (Rajput) families and Pathans, Kashmiries. The area is semi mountainous and part of the Pothohar Plateau. The Dadhocha Dam is planned to be constructed in the area.

== Dam ==
Dadhocha Dam is a proposed dam which is to be built near Dadhocha village in Rawalpindi, Pakistan. The dam was initially proposed in 2001 and Now it's under construction. Estimated cost of the dam is 7 billion. The reservoir will provide 24 million gallons of water to Rawalpindi on a daily basis.
