= Shinka =

Shinka شنکا
- Village
- Location within Pakistan
- Coordinates: 33°57′N 72°32′E
- Country: Pakistan
- Province: Punjab
- District: Attock
- Tehsil: Hazro
- Region: Chhachh

Area
  - Total: 23 km^{2} (8.9 sq mi)

Population (2025)
  - Total: 8,500
- Time zone: UTC+5 (PST)
  - Summer (DST): UTC+3 (PST)

Shinka is a village near Hazro Tehsil in Chach Valley of Attock District in Punjab province of Pakistan.

The nearby city, town and villages located near Shinka are Ghorghushti, Jalalia, Momanpur, Yaseen, Malak Mala, Behbudi, Nartopa and Hazro. Shinka has access to the Chach Interway, giving it access to Hazro Tehsil

This area is considered to be arable land and good soil for farming. The area, and the area around also has frequent rainstorms during the winter, and droughts during the summer. Around 100% of Shinka follows Islam. The majority of the income of villagers comes from farming, due to the highly arable land in the region.
