= Hameed, Attock =

Hameed
- Village
- Location within Pakistan
- Coordinates: 33°56′N 72°25′E
- Country: Pakistan
- Province: Punjab
- District: Attock
- Tehsil: Hazro
- Region: Chhachh
- Time zone: UTC+5 (PST)

Hameed (حمید) is a village in the Chach Valley of Hazro Tehsil in Attock District of Punjab Province, Pakistan.

== History ==
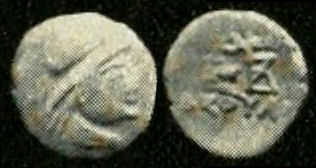
Coin of Liaka Kusulaka, an imitation of coins of Eucratides.

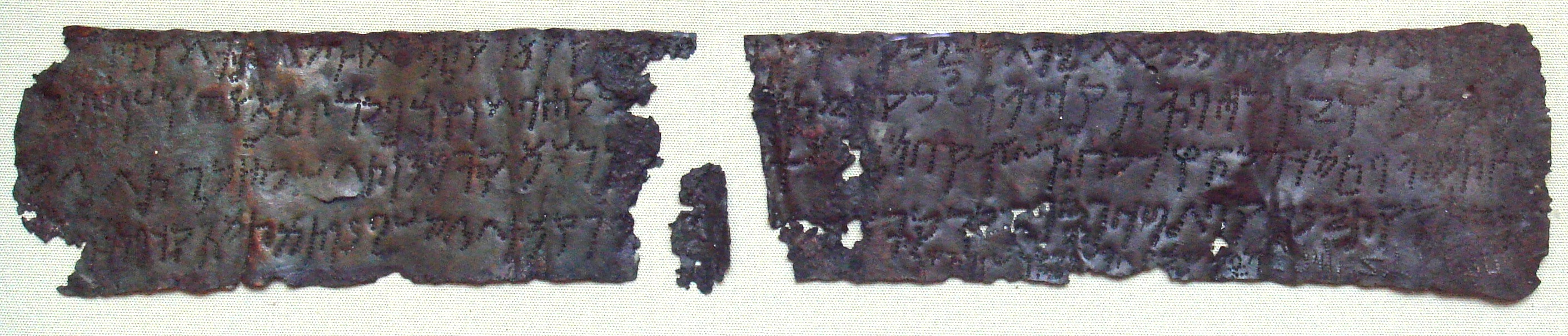
Liaka Kusulaka is mentioned in the Taxila copper plate (British Museum).

Liaka Kusulaka was an Indo-Scythian satrap of the area of Chukhsa (Chach) during the 1st century BCE.

The Battle of Chach was fought in 1008 AD between the Ghaznavid army of Sultan Mahmud of Ghazni and the Hindu Shahi army of Anandapala, resulting in the latter's defeat.

== Geography ==
Hameed is located in western Chhachh, about 4 km from the city of Hazro. Hameed has its own union council, which also governs other surrounding villages.
