= Malak Mala =

Malak Mala ملک مالا
- Village
- Location within Pakistan
- Coordinates: 33°56′N 72°25′E
- Country: Pakistan
- Province: Punjab
- District: Attock
- Tehsil: Hazro
- Region: Chhachh

Population
  - Total: 7,500
- Time zone: UTC+5 (PST)

Malak Mala is a village in the Chach Valley of Attock District in the northern part of Pakistan's Punjab province.

It lies close to the boundary of Khyber Pakhtunkhwa province. Neighboring villages include Barazai, Behbudi, Shinka, Nartopa and Ghorghushti town. The village's climate is similar to the villages around it. It has fertile soil which is great for farming. Malak Mala is around 544,384.32 m² in area. As of 2025, the population of Malak Mala was estimated to be around 7,500 to 8,500 people. Much of the population follows Islam.
