= Ghorghushti =

Ghorghushti غورغشتى
- Location in Pakistan
- Coordinates: 33°56′41″N 72°33′16″E
- Country: Pakistan
- Province: Punjab
- District: Attock District
- Tehsil: Hazro

Area
  - Total: 37 km^{2} (14 sq mi)

Population
  - Total: 40,000–50,000
- Time zone: UTC+5 (PST)
  - Summer (DST): +6
- Postal code span: 43410
- Area code: 0572

Ghorghushti is a town located in Hazro Tehsil of Attock District in Pakistan's Punjab province.

== Geography and climate ==
Ghorghushti lies about 4 kilometres east-north-east of Nartopa, and 6 km southwest of Qazipur, 7 km east-north-east of Hazro, and about 58 km west-north-west of Islamabad. Towns of the same name also exist in the former FATA area, Swabi District and in Buner.

Ghorghushti is the northernmost town in Attock District and in the north it borders Haripur District, in the south it borders Malak Mala village, in the west it borders Jalalia village and in the east it borders Kotkay village.

It is located at 33° 56' 41N latitude and 72° 33' 7E longitude. It has an altitude of 317 metres (1043 ft). The average annual rainfall in the district is 783 mm (30.83 inches).
