= Mohalla Sadiqabad =

- Mahallah
- Location within Pakistan
- Coordinates: 33°53′37″N 72°14′29″E
- Country: Pakistan
- Province: Punjab
- District: Attock
- Tehsil: Hazro
- Region: Chhachh
- Time zone: UTC+5 (PST)

Mohalla Sadiqabad (Urdu: محله صادق آباد) is a small neighbourhood in Mansar Town of Attock District in Punjab, Pakistan. Mohalla Sadiqabad is at a distance of about 200 metres (650 feet) north of the famous Grand Trunk Road.

It is located in the start of village Mansar while going to Mansar from Haji Shah or from Grand Trunk Road. A small Masjid is also present in Mohalla Sadiqabad.
