= Hazro =

Hazro can mean:

- Hazro, Diyarbakır Province, a district of Turkey
- Hazro, Punjab, a town in the Punjab province of Pakistan
- Hazro Tehsil, an administrative subdivision of Attock District, Pakistan
