= Kalu Kalan =

- Village
- Location within Pakistan
- Coordinates: 33°54′N 72°28′E
- Country: Pakistan
- Province: Punjab
- District: Attock
- Tehsil: Hazro
- Region: Chhachh
- Time zone: UTC+5 (PST)

Kalu Kalan is a village in Hazro Tehsil of Attock District in Punjab, Pakistan. Kalu Kalan is situated in the west of Chhachh Valley about 2 km from Hazro city.
