= Dilawarabad =

- Village
- Location within Pakistan
- Coordinates: 34°09′N 71°50′E
- Country: Pakistan
- Province: Punjab
- District: Attock
- Tehsil: Hazro
- Region: Chhachh
- Time zone: UTC+5 (PST)

Dilawarabad (Urdu: دلاور أباد) is a village located in the District Attock of the Punjab province of Pakistan.

== Facilities ==
There are several mosques but the main mosque is Shah i Masjid, and Madinah Masjid, both are close to each other. There are two cemeteries in Dilawarabad, both of which are close together. There is a pink resting area which can be utilized as a bus stop, or a short-haul taxi stop for QingQi and Tezraftar where both of them terminate in Gondal or Mallah.
