= Momanpur =

Momanpur may refer to:

- Momanpur, Bhopal, a village in India
- Momanpur, Pakistan, a village in Pakistan
