= 2010–11 Al-Zawraa SC season =

Al Zawraa
Iraqi Premier League season
- Chairman: (Iraq) Falah Hassan
- Manager: (Iraq) Radhi Shenaishil
- Ground: Al Zawraa Stadium
- Iraqi Premier League: Champions
- Top goalscorer: League: Mohammed Saad (8); All: Mohammed Saad (8)
Home colours	Away colours

The 2010-11 was Al Zawraa's 37th season in the Iraqi Premier League. Al Zawraa competed in the Iraqi Premier League and in the Arab Champions League.

== Squad ==
Note: Flags indicate national team as defined under FIFA eligibility rules; some limited exceptions apply. Players may hold more than one non-FIFA nationality.

No.	Pos.	Nation	Player
4	MF	(Iraq) IRQ	Akram Sattar Jabar
6	MF	(Iraq) IRQ	Mohammed Najm
7	FW	(Iraq) IRQ	Mousa Hashem
8	FW	(Iraq) IRQ	Hesham Mohammed (captain)
9	FW	(Iraq) IRQ	Marwan Hussein
12	MF	(Iraq) IRQ	Mohammed Fadhel
13	DF	(Iraq) IRQ	Omar Sabah Jassim
16	MF	(Iraq) IRQ	Haider Saadoun
17	MF	(Iraq) IRQ	Haidar Sabah
18	DF	(Iraq) IRQ	Adnan Atheiah
20	DF	(Iraq) IRQ	Haidar Alaiwi
21	MF	(Iraq) IRQ	Ali Qasem

No.	Pos.	Nation	Player
22	GK	(Iraq) IRQ	Ammar Ali Al-Azzawi
23	MF	(Iraq) IRQ	Azher Taher
27	FW	(Iraq) IRQ	Mezher Ahmad
28	MF	(Iraq) IRQ	Sajad Hussein
29	DF	(Iraq) IRQ	Ali Kamel
30	MF	(Iraq) IRQ	Yasser Abdul Karim
37	FW	(Iraq) IRQ	Mohammed Abdul-Jabar
38	MF	(Iraq) IRQ	Zaman Nafea
99	MF	(Iraq) IRQ	Usamah Ali

== Transfers ==
=== In ===
Date	Pos.	Name	From	Fee
September 2010	MF	(Iraq) Ahmed Abdul-Jabar	(Iraq) Baghdad FC	-
September 2010	MF	(Iraq) Haidar Sabah	(Iraq) Baghdad FC	-
September 2010	FW	(Iraq) Mohammed Saad	(Iraq) Dohuk FC	-
September 2010	FW	(Iraq) Ahmed Ibrahim	(Iraq) Baghdad FC	-
September 2010	MF	(Iraq) Azher Taher	(Iraq) Najaf FC	-
September 2010	DF	(Iraq) Waleed Khalid	(Iraq) Baghdad FC	-
September 2010	DF	(Iraq) Gaith Abdul-Ghani	(Iraq) Baghdad FC	-

== Matches ==
=== Competitive ===
==== Iraqi Premier League ====
26 November 2010 1	Al Zawraa	1 – 0	Karbalaa FC	Baghdad
11:30 GMT	Haidar Sabah 27'			Stadium: Al Zawraa Stadium

3 December 2010 2	Al-Quwa Al-Jawiya	2 – 0	Al Zawraa	Baghdad
11:30 GMT	Mohammed Abdul-Zahra 21'; Hammadi Ahmed 89'			Stadium: Al-Quwa Al-Jawiya Stadium

10 December 2010 3	Al Zawraa	2 – 1	Al-Hindiya	Baghdad
11:30 GMT	Fares Hasan 25'; Usama Ali 93'		85'	Stadium: Al Zawraa Stadium

20 December 2010 4	Nassriya FC	0 – 1	Al Zawraa	Nasiriyah
11:00 GMT			Mubarouk Matroud og 65'

25 December 2011 5	Naft Maysan	1 – 1	Al Zawraa	Amarah
11:00 GMT	78'		Mohammed Saad 56'

31 December 2011 6	Al Zawraa	2 – 1	Al-Hasanain	Baghdad
11:30 GMT	Fares Hasan 10'; Azher Taher 43'		Galeb Mohammed 40'	Stadium: Al Zawraa Stadium

7 January 2011 7	Al Zawraa	1 – 0	Najaf FC	Baghdad
11:30 GMT	Mohammed Saad 35'			Stadium: Al Zawraa Stadium

14 January 2011 8	Al Masafi	0 – 2	Al Zawraa	Baghdad
11:30 GMT			Mohammed Saad 49'; Marwan Hussein 93'	Stadium: Al Masafi Stadium

31 January 2011 9	Al Talaba	0 – 0	Al Zawraa	Baghdad
11:30 GMT				Stadium: Al Karkh Stadium

4 February 2011 10	Al Zawraa	4 – 2	Naft Al Janoob	Baghdad
11:30 GMT	Mohammed Saad 5'; Mohammed Abdul Jabbar 29'; Haidar Sabbah 45'; Hesham Mohammed 90'		Ali Jawad 2'; Hussam Khadum 23'	Stadium: Al Zawraa Stadium

11 February 2011 11	Al-Minaa	3 – 1	Al Zawraa	Basra
11:00 GMT	Mohammed Nasser 19'; Husam Ibrahim 45'; Faisal Kadhem 78'		Ali Saad 54'	Stadium: Al-Mina'a Stadium

18 February 2011 12	Al Zawraa	5 – 0	Al-Diwaniya FC	Baghdad
11:30 GMT	Hesham Mohammed 13'; Ali Qasem 20', 45'; Usamah Ali 25'; Ali Saad 90'			Stadium: Al Zawraa Stadium

27 February 2011 13	Al Zawraa	0 – 0	Baghdad FC	Baghdad
11:30 GMT				Stadium: Al Zawraa Stadium

13 March 2011 14	Karbalaa FC	1 – 2	Al Zawraa	Karbalaa
11:30 GMT	Musthaq Sallal 41'		Fares Hassan 50'; Mohammed Saad 77'	Stadium: Karbalaa Stadium

19 March 2011 15	Al-Zawraa	1 – 0	Al-Quwa Al-Jawiya	Baghdad
15:05 GMT	Ali Saad 20'			Stadium: Al-Shaab Stadium

28 March 2011 16	Al-Hindiya	0 – 4	Al Zawraa	Karbalaa
12:00 GMT			Ali Saad 51', 67'; Mohammed Saad 61', 80'	Stadium: Karbalaa Stadium

3 April 2011 17	Al-Zawraa	3 – 0	Nasiriya FC	Baghdad
12:00 GMT	Mohammed Saad 5'; Ali Saad 65'; Samir Saeed 92'			Stadium: Al Zawraa Stadium

10 April 2011 18	Al-Zawraa	0 – 0	Naft Maysan	Baghdad
12:00 GMT				Stadium: Al Zawaa Stadium
