= Ababakar =

Aba Bakar
- Village
- Location within Pakistan
- Coordinates: 33°56′N 72°25′E
- Country: Pakistan
- Province: Punjab
- District: Attock
- Tehsil: Hazro
- Region: Chhachh
- Time zone: UTC+5 (PST)

Ababakar (Urdu: ابابکر) is a small village in the Chach Valley of Hazro Tehsil in Attock District of Punjab Province, Pakistan
