= Sirka, Attock =

Pakistani village

Sirka (Sirki)
- Village
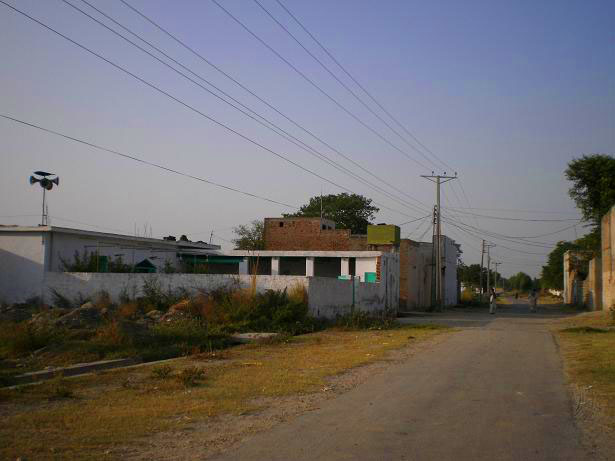
- Sirka River Road.

- Location within Pakistan
- Coordinates: 33°56′N 72°23′E
- Country: Pakistan
- Province: Punjab
- District: Attock
- Tehsil: Hazro
- Region: Chhachh
- Time zone: UTC+5 (PST)

Sirka is a village located in the Chhachh, Hazro Tehsil, within Attock District, Punjab, Pakistan. Sirka lies approximately 60 miles west of Pakistan's capital, Islamabad. It is believed to be called the Barakzai’s Village

Sirka is situated about one mile south of the Indus River. It is bordered by the village of Waisa to the southeast, Tajak to the south, Shadi Khan to the southeast, and the Indus River to the north.

Sirka is a majority Pashtun village with most people belonging from Barakzai tribe, there is a small population of Kashmiris living in Sirka.

Most of the people of Sirka speak Pashto as their first language as they are taught about their Pashtun identity from a young age. They follow the code of Pashtunwali and has preserved their Pashtun identity.
