= Momanpur, Attock =

Momanpur
- Village
- Location within Pakistan
- Coordinates: 33.97°N 72.54°E
- Country: Pakistan
- Province: Punjab
- District: Attock
- Tehsil: Hazro
- Region: Chhachh
- Time zone: UTC+5 (PST)

Momanpur is a small village bordering Jalalia along Indus River in Chhachh Valley of Attock District in Punjab, Pakistan.

- Location and History: Momanpur is a small village in the Chhachh Valley of Attock District, Punjab, Pakistan, situated along the Indus River near Jalalia village. Approximately 440 years ago, it was established by two Pathan brothers, Daulat Khan and Momin Khan, who belonged to a branch of the Alizai tribe. The village was named after Momin Khan, hence “Momanpur.” The Alizai are a Pashtun tribe, part of the larger Durrani confederation, with historical roots in southern Afghanistan and northern Pakistan.
- Land and Legacy: Momanpur was historically a village with extensive land holdings stretching from Jalalia to Zaida, Gar Munara (Khyber Pakhtunkhwa), and up to Panj Ter in Nartopa. This is documented in the old land registry of the Panj Ter area. The descendants of Daulat Khan, particularly through his sons Anwar Khan and Khushal Khan, still reside in the village. Notable lineages include Jamal Khan (son of Anwar Khan) and Ghazi Khan (grandson of Anwar Khan) as well as Mir Alam Khan and Shah Wali Khan (from Khushal Khan’s line).
- Cultural Context: The Alizai tribe, to which the founders of Momanpur belonged, is prominent in the region.
