= Sirka =

Sirka may refer to several places:

- Sirka, India, a town in Ramgarh district in the Indian state of Jharkhand.
- Sirka, Pakistan, a village in Tehsil Hazro, Attock District, Punjab, Pakistan.
- Sirka, Togo, a village in Binah Prefecture in the Kara Region of Togo.
