= Kamalpur Musa =

- Village
- Location within Pakistan
- Coordinates: 33°55′N 72°24′E
- Country: Pakistan
- Province: Punjab
- District: Attock
- Tehsil: Hazro
- Time zone: UTC+5 (PST)
- Website: https://www.kamalpurmusa.com

Kamalpur Musa is a village in Hazro Tehsil of Attock District in Punjab Province of Pakistan.
