= Naveed Khan =

Pakistani-born Hong Kong footballer (born 2000)

Personal information
- Full name: Naveed Khan
- Date of birth: 7 January 2000 (age 26)
- Place of birth: Waisa, Attock, Pakistan
- Height: 1.83 m (6 ft 0 in)
- Positions: Winger; forward

Team information
- Current team: Eastern
- Number: 7

Youth career
- 2015–2018: Eastern

Senior career*
Years	Team	Apps	(Gls)
2018–2022	Eastern	6	(1)
2022–2023	Tai Po	10	(2)
2023–2024	North District	10	(0)
2024–2025	Central & Western	20	(9)
2025–2026	HKFC	20	(5)
2026–	Eastern	4	(0)
- * Club domestic league appearances and goals as of 8 November 2026

Naveed Khan (Chinese: 王力威; born 7 January 2000) is a professional footballer who currently plays as a winger for Hong Kong Premier League club Eastern. Born in Pakistan, he acquired his HKSAR passport in March 2023.

== Club career ==
Khan started his career with Eastern. On 28 October 2020, Khan scored his first 2 goals for Eastern during a 5–0 Sapling Cup win over Resources Capital. On 27 March 2021, Khan made his league debut for Eastern during a 3–1 win over Rangers.

On 20 April 2022, Khan left Eastern.

On 8 August 2022, Khan joined Tai Po.

On 21 July 2023, Khan joined North District.

In August 2024, Khan joined Central & Western.

On 1 August 2025, Khan returned to the top flight and joined HKFC.

On 21 July 2026, Khan returned to Eastern.

== Personal life ==
Born in Pakistan, Khan moved to Hong Kong at the age of five. He started playing football at the age of twelve.

On 9 March 2023, Khan officially announced that he had received a HKSAR passport after giving up his Pakistani passport, making him eligible to represent Hong Kong internationally.
