= Painda =

- Village
- Location within Pakistan
- Coordinates: 32.49°N 72.48°E
- Country: Pakistan
- Province: Punjab
- District: Attock
- Tehsil: Hazro
- Region: Chhachh
- Time zone: UTC+5 (PST)

Painda is a village in Hazro Tehsil of Attock District in Punjab, Pakistan. It is located about 64 km (40 mi) north-west of Islamabad. Painda is a populated place (class P - Populated Place) based on the region font code of Asia/Pacific. It is located at an elevation of 285 meters above sea level.
