= Pirdad =

- Mohallah
- Location within Pakistan
- Coordinates: 33°56′N 72°25′E
- Country: Pakistan
- Province: Punjab
- District: Attock
- Tehsil: Hazro
- Time zone: UTC+5 (PST)

Pirdad is a Mohallah in Hazro Tehsil of Attock District in Punjab Province of Pakistan.

== Notable people ==
- Zubayr Ali Za'i
