= Shamsabad, Pakistan =

Shamsabad
- Village
- Location within Pakistan
- Coordinates: 32.49°N 72.48°E
- Country: Pakistan
- Province: Punjab
- District: Attock
- Tehsil: Hazro
- Region: Chhachh
- Time zone: UTC+5 (PST)
- Website: shamsabad.com

Shamsabad is a village located in Attock District of Punjab, Pakistan.

Shamsabad (شمس آباد) is a village in Hazro Tehsil, Attock District, Punjab, Pakistan. Situated in the hilly terrain between Rawalpindi and the Indus river valley, it lies along the historic route connecting the Punjab plains to the northwestern passes. Its elevated position gave it strategic military and administrative significance across several centuries. The village is recorded in revenue documents as both a Qanoongoi (revenue circle) and a Mauza (revenue village), containing 123 kheewats and over 1,200 individual land parcels (khasras).

Origins & Early Settlers The dominant community of Shamsabad belongs to the Awan (اعوان) tribe. The founding ancestor most clearly identified in local tradition is Mehr Mujeed, who is placed in the mid-17th century (circa 1660s) and is said to have migrated from the Sialkot area into this valley. His descendants — through Muhammad Usman, Taj Khan, Yusuf Khan, Sher Muhammad, Muttha Khan, and Allah Yar Khan — form the primary lineage that shaped Shamsabad's identity over the following two centuries.
