= 2017–18 Departmental One Day Cup =

Cricket tournament

- Dates: 28 December 2017 – 14 January 2018
- Administrator(s): Pakistan Cricket Board
- Cricket format: List A cricket
- Tournament format(s): Round-robin and Finals
- Champions: United Bank Limited
- Participants: 8
- Most runs: Shan Masood (632)
- Most wickets: Sadaf Hussain (18)
- Official website: PCB

The 2017–18 Departmental One Day Cup was a List A cricket tournament in Pakistan. The competition ran from 28 December 2017 to 14 January 2018. Habib Bank Limited were the defending champions. United Bank Limited won the tournament, beating Water and Power Development Authority by 6 wickets in the final.

== Teams ==
The following teams are competing:

- Habib Bank Limited
- Khan Research Laboratories
- National Bank of Pakistan
- Pakistan Television
- Sui Northern Gas Pipelines Limited
- Sui Southern Gas Corporation
- United Bank Limited
- Water and Power Development Authority

== Points table ==
Team	Pld	W	L	NR	Pts	NRR
United Bank Limited	7	7	0	0	14	+2.024
Water and Power Development Authority	7	5	2	0	10	+0.077
Sui Southern Gas Corporation	7	4	3	0	8	+0.801
Pakistan Television	7	4	3	0	8	+0.327
Sui Northern Gas Pipelines Limited	7	4	3	0	8	+0.062
Habib Bank Limited	7	3	4	0	6	–0.997
Khan Research Laboratories	7	1	6	0	2	–1.169
National Bank of Pakistan	7	0	7	0	0	–1.182

Teams qualified for the finals

== Fixtures ==
=== Round 1 ===
28 December 2017
Scorecard

Sui Northern Gas Pipelines Limited; 321/4 (50 overs)	v	Khan Research Laboratories; 209/8 (50 overs)
Iftikhar Ahmed 68 (44); Nauman Ali 2/39 (10 overs)		Junaid Ali 38 (50); Imran Khalid 4/39 (10 overs)

Sui Northern Gas Pipelines Limited won by 112 runs
Niaz Stadium, Hyderabad
Umpires: Qaiser Waheed and Tahir Rasheed

- Sui Northern Gas Pipelines Limited won the toss and elected to bat.

28 December 2017
Scorecard

National Bank of Pakistan; 317/7 (50 overs)	v	Habib Bank Limited; 320/5 (48.3 overs)
Naved Yasin 101 (100); Abdur Rehman 3/53 (9 overs)		Ahmed Shehzad 162* (142); Ghulam Mudassar 2/58 (9.3 overs)

Habib Bank Limited won by 5 wickets
National Bank of Pakistan Sports Complex, Karachi
Umpires: Majid Hussain and Shozab Raza

- Habib Bank Limited won the toss and elected to field.
- Ahmed Hasan (National Bank of Pakistan) made his List A debut.

28 December 2017
Scorecard

Water and Power Development Authority; 272 (50 overs)	v	Sui Southern Gas Corporation; 199 (46.4 overs)
Khushdil Shah 103 (86); Ahmed Jamal 3/41 (10 overs)		Sami Aslam 80 (91); Mohammad Irfan 3/16 (7.4 overs)

Water and Power Development Authority won by 73 runs
State Bank of Pakistan Sports Complex, Karachi
Umpires: Imtiaz Iqbal and Rashid Riaz

- Sui Southern Gas Corporation won the toss and elected to field.
- Mesome Hussain and Hasnain Shah (Water and Power Development Authority) both made their List A debuts.

28 December 2017
Scorecard

United Bank Limited; 296/9 (50 overs)	v	Pakistan Television; 232 (46 overs)
Shan Masood 145* (146); Mohammad Irfan 3/51 (10 overs)		Hasan Mohsin 63 (66); Sohaib Maqsood 2/17 (4 overs)

United Bank Limited won by 64 runs
United Bank Limited Sports Complex, Karachi
Umpires: Mohammad Sajid and Riazuddin

- Pakistan Television won the toss and elected to field.
- Waleed Malik and Athar Mahmood (Pakistan Television) both made their List A debuts.

=== Round 2 ===
30 December 2017
Scorecard

Sui Southern Gas Corporation; 291/7 (50 overs)	v	Khan Research Laboratories; 204 (44.1 overs)
Fawad Alam 71 (73); Sadaf Hussain 3/61 (10 overs)		Hasan Raza 45 (69); Ahmed Jamal 3/37 (8.1 overs)

Sui Southern Gas Corporation won by 87 runs
Niaz Stadium, Hyderabad
Umpires: Khalid Mahmood and Rashid Riaz

- Sui Southern Gas Corporation and elected to bat.

30 December 2017
Scorecard

Water and Power Development Authority; 231/7 (50 overs)	v	Sui Northern Gas Pipelines Limited; 232/3 (44.2 overs)
Salman Butt 49* (83); Imran Khalid 3/50 (10 overs)		Mohammad Rizwan 63* (63); Khalid Usman 2/42 (10 overs)

Sui Northern Gas Pipelines Limited won by 7 wickets
State Bank of Pakistan Sports Complex, Karachi
Umpires: Ghaffar Kazmi and Majid Hussain

- Water and Power Development Authority won the toss and elected to bat.

30 December 2017
Scorecard

Pakistan Television; 244 (49.5 overs)	v	National Bank of Pakistan; 237 (50 overs)
Hasan Raza 97 (116); Raza Hasan 4/49 (9.5 overs)		Naved Yasin 69 (85); Mohammad Irfan 4/46 (10 overs)

Pakistan Television won by 7 runs
National Bank of Pakistan Sports Complex, Karachi
Umpires: Mohammad Sajid and Qaiser Waheed

- National Bank of Pakistan won the toss and elected to field.

30 December 2017
Scorecard

Habib Bank Limited; 104 (31.2 overs)	v	United Bank Limited; 106/1 (16.3 overs)
Rameez Aziz 30 (72); Ashiq Ali 4/20 (4.2 overs)		Shan Masood 58* (55); Rameez Aziz 1/13 (1.3 overs)

United Bank Limited won by 9 wickets
United Bank Limited Sports Complex, Karachi
Umpires: Mohammad Asif and Shozab Raza

- United Bank Limited won the toss and elected to field.

=== Round 3 ===
1 January 2018
Scorecard

Sui Northern Gas Pipelines Limited; 71 (27.5 overs)	v	Sui Southern Gas Corporation; 72/1 (14.4 overs)
Asad Shafiq 15 (40); Ahmed Jamal 4/28 (9 overs)		Sami Aslam 39* (43); Rahat Ali 1/22 (4 overs)

Sui Southern Gas Corporation won by 9 wickets
United Bank Limited Sports Complex, Karachi
Umpires: Ghaffar Kazmi and Shameem Ansari

- Sui Southern Gas Corporation won the toss and elected to field.

1 January 2018
Scorecard

United Bank Limited; 344/3 (47 overs)	v	National Bank of Pakistan; 250/7 (47 overs)
Sohaib Maqsood 112 (83); Altaf Ahmed 1/41 (6 overs)		Qaiser Abbas 57* (62); Ashiq Ali 2/51 (9 overs)

United Bank Limited won by 94 runs
Niaz Stadium, Hyderabad
Umpires: Majid Hussain and Mohammad Sajid

- United Bank Limited won the toss and elected to bat.

1 January 2018
Scorecard

Habib Bank Limited; 113 (36.5 overs)	v	Pakistan Television; 118/0 (17.2 overs)
Salman Afridi 50 (85); Samiullah 3/8 (5.5 overs)		Mohammad Yasin 59* (49)

Pakistan Television won by 10 wickets
State Bank of Pakistan Sports Complex, Karachi
Umpires: Khalid Mahmood and Qaiser Waheed

- Pakistan Television won the toss and elected to field.
- Israr-ul-Haq (Habib Bank Limited) made his List A debut.

1 January 2018
Scorecard

Water and Power Development Authority; 277/9 (50 overs)	v	Khan Research Laboratories; 233/8 (50 overs)
Zahid Mansoor 90 (88); Yasir Ali 3/35 (10 overs)		Junaid Ali 67 (74); Wahab Riaz 4/48 (10 overs)

Water and Power Development Authority won by 44 runs
National Bank of Pakistan Sports Complex, Karachi
Umpires: Mohammad Asif and Rashid Riaz

- Khan Research Laboratories won the toss and elected to field.

=== Round 4 ===
3 January 2018
Scorecard

Khan Research Laboratories; 177 (48 overs)	v	National Bank of Pakistan; 168 (47.4 overs)
Nauman Ali 31* (32); Bilal Asif 3/43 (10 overs)		Usama Ali 40 (85); Sadaf Hussain 3/22 (9 overs)

Khan Research Laboratories won by 9 runs
National Bank of Pakistan Sports Complex, Karachi
Umpires: Tahir Rasheed and Zameer Haider

- National Bank of Pakistan won the toss and elected to field.
- Usama Ali and Saif Ali (National Bank of Pakistan) both made their List A debuts.

3 January 2018
Scorecard

Habib Bank Limited; 314/8 (47 overs)	v	Water and Power Development Authority; 318/3 (45.1 overs)
Ahmed Shehzad 110 (107); Zahid Mansoor 4/52 (9 overs)		Kamran Akmal 200 (148); Bilal Shah 2/53 (8 overs)

Water and Power Development Authority won by 7 wickets
Niaz Stadium, Hyderabad
Umpires: Rashid Riaz and Shameem Ansari

- Habib Bank Limited won the toss and elected to bat.
- Kamran Akmal (Water and Power Development Authority) scored the fastest double century in List A cricket by a wicketkeeper-batsman.

3 January 2018
Scorecard

United Bank Limited; 265/8 (50 overs)	v	Sui Southern Gas Corporation; 212 (46.1 overs)
Umar Akmal 82 (90); Kashif Bhatti 2/27 (10 overs)		Sami Aslam 88 (105); Mohammad Asghar 4/31 (10 overs)

United Bank Limited won by 53 runs
United Bank Limited Sports Complex, Karachi
Umpires: Ahmed Shahab and Asif Yaqoob

- Sui Southern Gas Corporation won the toss and elected to field.

3 January 2018
Scorecard

Pakistan Television; 253/8 (50 overs)	v	Sui Northern Gas Pipelines Limited; 244 (44.3 overs)
Nihal Mansoor 58 (66); Mohammad Abbas 2/33 (9 overs)		Asad Shafiq 75 (89); Athar Mahmood 5/28 (9.3 overs)

Pakistan Television won by 9 runs
State Bank of Pakistan Sports Complex, Karachi
Umpires: Khalid Mahmood and Mohammad Asif

- Sui Northern Gas Pipelines Limited won the toss and elected to field.

=== Round 5 ===
5 January 2018
Scorecard

Sui Northern Gas Pipelines Limited; 293/6 (50 overs)	v	United Bank Limited; 295/5 (44.2 overs)
Iftikhar Ahmed 75 (69); Sadaif Mehdi 3/54 (8 overs)		Umar Akmal 124 (84); Imran Khalid 2/72 (10 overs)

United Bank Limited won by 5 wickets
United Bank Limited Sports Complex, Karachi
Umpires: Ahmed Shahab and Khalid Mahmood

- United Bank Limited won the toss and elected to field.

5 January 2018
Scorecard

National Bank of Pakistan; 120 (32.4 overs)	v	Sui Southern Gas Corporation; 122/1 (22.4 overs)
Ahsan Ali 44 (46); Usama Mir 3/21 (4 overs)		Sami Aslam 52* (65); Hamza Paracha 1/24 (3.4 overs)

Sui Southern Gas Corporation won by 9 wickets
National Bank of Pakistan Sports Complex, Karachi
Umpires: Aaley Haider and Zameer Haider

- Sui Southern Gas Corporation won the toss and elected to field.

5 January 2018
Scorecard

Habib Bank Limited; 212/8 (50 overs)	v	Khan Research Laboratories; 206 (49.4 overs)
Ahmed Shehzad 82 (92); Yasir Ali 3/30 (10 overs)		Jaahid Ali 73 (109); Amad Butt 4/32 (9.4 overs)

Habib Bank Limited won by 6 runs
State Bank of Pakistan Sports Complex, Karachi
Umpires: Asif Yaqoob and Waleed Yaqub

- Khan Research Laboratories won the toss and elected to field.

5 January 2018
Scorecard

Pakistan Television; 300 (49.5 overs)	v	Water and Power Development Authority; 301/7 (49 overs)
Saud Shakeel 94 (89); Wahab Riaz 3/52 (8.5 overs)		Salman Butt 102 (102); Mohammad Irfan 3/78 (10 overs)

Water and Power Development Authority won by 3 wickets
Niaz Stadium, Hyderabad
Umpires: Imtiaz Iqbal and Riazuddin

- Water and Power Development Authority won the toss and elected to field.
- Shahid Ilyas (Pakistan Television) made his List A debut.

=== Round 6 ===
7 January 2018
Scorecard

National Bank of Pakistan; 203/9 (50 overs)	v	Sui Northern Gas Pipelines Limited; 204/2 (31.4 overs)
Ali Asad 63 (62); Mohammad Imran 2/11 (3 overs)		Asad Shafiq 101* (98); Kamran Ghulam 1/50 (8 overs)

Sui Northern Gas Pipelines Limited won by 8 wickets
Niaz Stadium, Hyderabad
Umpires: Ahmed Shahab and Tahir Rasheed

- National Bank of Pakistan won the toss and elected to bat first.

7 January 2018
Scorecard

Habib Bank Limited; 238 (48.4 overs)	v	Sui Southern Gas Corporation; 201 (43.4 overs)
Imran Farhat 67 (74); Zia-ul-Haq 4/46 (9.4 overs)		Kashif Bhatti 38 (37); Amad Butt 3/40 (9 overs)

Habib Bank Limited won by 37 runs
State Bank of Pakistan Sports Complex, Karachi
Umpires: Aaley Haider and Zameer Haider

- Habib Bank Limited won the toss and elected to bat.

7 January 2018
Scorecard

Water and Power Development Authority; 197 (49.1 overs)	v	United Bank Limited; 198/2 (29.1 overs)
Mansoor Amjad 92 (104); Mir Hamza 4/43 (10 overs)		Sohaib Maqsood 69* (36); Mohammad Irfan 1/17 (6 overs)

United Bank Limited won by 8 wickets
United Bank Limited Sports Complex, Karachi
Umpires: Asif Yaqoob and Imtiaz Iqbal

- United Bank Limited won the toss and elected to field.
- Umer Khan (United Bank Limited) made his List A debut.

7 January 2018
Scorecard

Pakistan Television; 270 (50 overs)	v	Khan Research Laboratories; 213/9 (50 overs)
Saud Shakeel 82 (98); Sadaf Hussain 4/63 (10 overs)		Jaahid Ali 52 (62); Ali Khan 3/32 (10 overs)

Pakistan Television won by 57 runs
National Bank of Pakistan Sports Complex, Karachi
Umpires: Khalid Mahmood and Waheed Yaqoob

- Khan Research Laboratories won the toss and elected to field first.

=== Round 7 ===
9 January 2018
Scorecard

National Bank of Pakistan; 218 (48.2 overs)	v	Water and Power Development Authority; 222/4 (44.5 overs)
Rameez Raja 59 (73); Mansoor Amjad 4/45 (9.2 overs)		Kamran Akmal 115 (125); Bilal Asif 2/38 (10 overs)

Water and Power Development Authority won by 6 wickets.
National Bank of Pakistan Sports Complex, Karachi
Umpires: Aaley Haider and Asif Yaqoob

- Water and Power Development Authority won the toss and elected to field.

9 January 2018
Scorecard

United Bank Limited; 286/8 (50 overs)	v	Khan Research Laboratories; 174 (39.2 overs)
Shan Masood 86 (115); Sadaf Hussain 4/55 (10 overs)		Saif Badar 34 (39); Mir Hamza 3/43 (10 overs)

United Bank Limited won by 112 runs
State Bank of Pakistan Sports Complex, Karachi
Umpires: Riazuddin and Zameer Haider

- United Bank Limited won the toss and elected to bat.
- Shayan Sheikh (Khan Research Laboratories) made his List A debut.

9 January 2018
Scorecard

Pakistan Television; 194 (46.2 overs)	v	Sui Southern Gas Corporation; 195/2 (37.4 overs)
Nihal Mansoor 40 (57); Kashif Bhatti 4/29 (10 overs)		Sami Aslam 103* (99); Waleed Malik 1/46 (7.4 overs)

Sui Southern Gas Corporation won by 8 wickets
Niaz Stadium, Hyderabad
Umpires: Imtiaz Iqbal and Tahir Rasheed

- Sui Southern Gas Corporation won the toss and elected to field.

9 January 2018
Scorecard

Sui Northern Gas Pipelines Limited; 290/8 (48 overs)	v	Habib Bank Limited; 286 (47.4 overs)
Asad Shafiq 119 (135); Zohaib Khan 2/20 (6 overs)		Salman Afridi 93 (68); Mohammad Imran 3/55 (9.4 overs)

Sui Northern Gas Pipelines Limited won by 4 runs
United Bank Limited Sports Complex, Karachi
Umpires: Ahmed Shahab and Waleed Yaqub

- Habib Bank Limited won the toss and elected to field.

== Finals ==
1st Semi-final
11 January 2018
Scorecard

Sui Southern Gas Corporation; 235 (49.1 overs)	v	United Bank Limited; 239/3 (40.5 overs)
Sami Aslam 57 (63); Mohammad Asghar 2/34 (10 overs)		Shan Masood 100* (101); Fawad Alam 1/44 (10 overs)

United Bank Limited won by 7 wickets
National Bank of Pakistan Sports Complex, Karachi
Umpires: Ahmed Shahab and Khalid Mahmood

- United Bank Limited won the toss and elected to field.

2nd Semi-final
12 January 2018
Scorecard

Pakistan Television; 231/9 (50 overs)	v	Water and Power Development Authority; 234/1 (43 overs)
Saud Shakeel 47 (57); Mohammad Irfan 3/33 (10 overs)		Kamran Akmal 87 (86); Waleed Malik 1/49 (10 overs)

Water and Power Development Authority won by 9 wickets
United Bank Limited Sports Complex, Karachi
Umpires: Asif Yaqoob and Imtiaz Iqbal

- Water and Power Development Authority won the toss and elected to field.

Final
14 January 2018
Scorecard

Water and Power Development Authority; 218 (48.3 overs)	v	United Bank Limited; 220/4 (43 overs)
Khalid Usman 46 (60); Hammad Azam 3/35 (8.3 overs)		Sohaib Maqsood 63 (71); Khalid Usman 3/42 (10 overs)

United Bank Limited won by 6 wickets
United Bank Limited Sports Complex, Karachi
Umpires: Asif Yaqoob and Khalid Mahmood

- United Bank Limited won the toss and elected to field.
