= Nasozai =

Gharghasht Pashtun tribe

The Nasozai (Pashto: نسوزئ) are a Gharghasht Pashtun tribe.

== Origin ==
The people of Nasozai migrated from Afghanistan (Nasozai) to Chhachh, Attock District in 1723.
