= Malhoo =

- Village
- Location within Pakistan
- Coordinates: 33°56′N 72°25′E
- Country: Pakistan
- Province: Punjab
- District: Attock
- Tehsil: Hazro
- Region: Chhachh
- Time zone: UTC+5 (PST)

Malhoo (Urdu:ملہو) is a village in the Chach Valley in Hazro Tehsil of Attock District in Punjab, Pakistan.

== Geography ==
Malhoo is situated 6 km north of Kamra from Rawalpindi-Peshawar GT Road and six kilometres south of the Indus River.

== Notable people ==
- Lieutenant General Jahan Dad Khan, the 14th Governor of Sindh, Chairman of the Pakistan Red Crescent Society and President of the Al-Shifa Eye Trust, founded many eye hospitals and won awards for his national and international humanitarian work to prevent blindness.
