= Nartopa =

- Village
- Flag

- Location within Pakistan
- Coordinates: 33°54′51″N 72°31′7″E
- Country: Pakistan
- Province: Punjab
- District: Attock
- Tehsil: Hazro
- Region: Chhachh
- Time zone: UTC+5 (PST)

Nartopa (Urdu/Punjabi: نرتوپہ) is a village located in the Hazro Tehsil of Attock District in Punjab, Pakistan.

== Geography ==
The village produces a number of crops. Nearby villages include Behboodi and Malak Mala.
