= Mesome Hussain =

Pakistani cricketer (born 1995)

Personal information
- Born: 2 July 1995 (age 31)
- Source: Cricinfo, 29 December 2017

Mesome Hussain (born 2 July 1995) is a Pakistani cricketer. He made his List A debut for Water and Power Development Authority in the 2017–18 Departmental One Day Cup on 28 December 2017.
