= Mansar, Pakistan =

Mansar
- Town
- Location within Pakistan
- Coordinates: 33°54′10″N 72°18′38″E
- Country: Pakistan
- Province: Punjab
- District: Attock
- Tehsil: Hazro
- Region: Chhachh
- Time zone: UTC+5 (PST)

Mansar (Urdu:مانسر) is a town in the Chach Valley, in Hazro Tehsil of Attock District in Punjab, Pakistan.

It is located close to bank of the Indus River, and the Azad Kashmir Regiment of Pakistan Army is based close to this village.

== Shrines ==
The shrines of the Sufi saint Sin Kalo Baba (سائیں کلو بابا), his disciple Sayyad Anwar Shah (سید انور شاہ) and a disciple of Sayyad Anwar Shah, Bhai Mohammad Alam (بھائی محمد عالم) are located here.
