= Barazai =

- Village
- Location within Pakistan
- Coordinates: 33°55′16″N 72°32′31″E
- Country: Pakistan
- Province: Punjab
- District: Attock
- Tehsil: Hazro
- Region: Chhachh

Area
  - Total: 370 ha (920 acres)
- Elevation: 315 m (1,033 ft)

Population (2023)
  - Total: 6,363
- Time zone: UTC+5 (PST)
- Postcode: 43430

Barazai is a village situated in the east of Hazro Tehsil, Attock District in northern Punjab in Pakistan. The village's altitude is 315 metres (1036 feet).
