= Khagwani =

- Town
- Location within Pakistan
- Coordinates: 33°54′35″N 72°29′34″E
- Country: Pakistan
- Province: Punjab
- District: Attock
- Tehsil: Hazro
- Time zone: UTC+5 (PST)

Khagwani is a town in Hazro Tehsil of Attock District in Punjab Province of Pakistan.
