= Hazro Tehsil =

Tehsil subdivision in Punjab, Pakistan

Hazro Tehsil تحصیل حضرو
- Tehsil
- Hazro
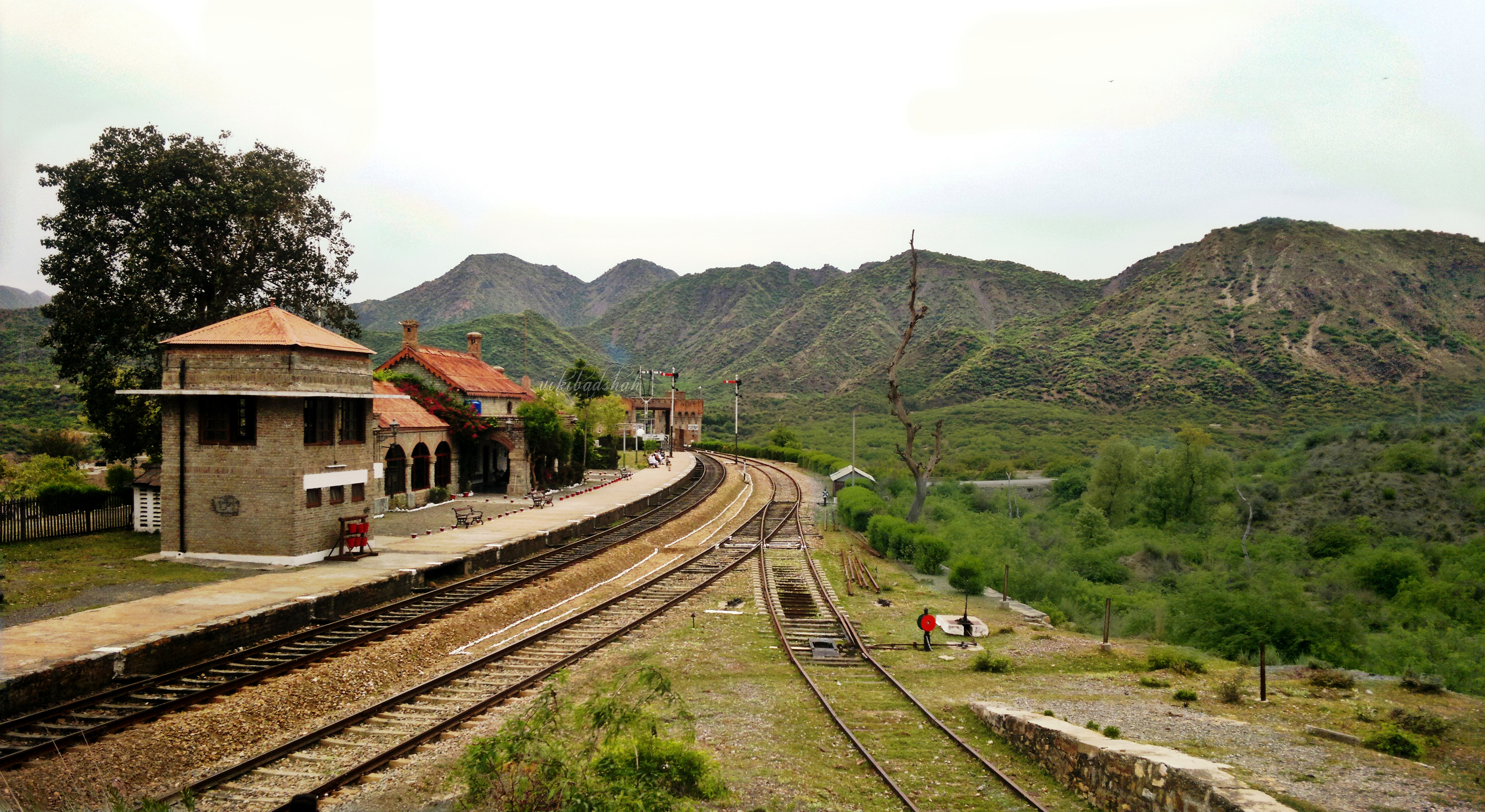

- Location within Punjab, Pakistan Location within Pakistan
- Coordinates: 33°41′33″N 72°27′12″E
- Country: Pakistan
- Province: Punjab
- District: Attock

Population (2023)
  - Tehsil: 386,544
  - Urban: 62,972
  - Rural: 323,572
- Time zone: UTC+5 (PST)
- Postal code: 43440

Hazro Tehsil is a tehsil of Attock District in the Punjab Province of Pakistan, about 85 km away from Islamabad and 7 km from Grand Trunk Road. The town of Hazro is also connected to Islamabad motorway through Chach Interchange, and Peshawar motorway via the same route.

Hazro tehsil was created from parts of the NA-57 constituency of Attock with the town of Hazro serving as the tehsil headquarter.

== List of villages ==
List of villages in the tehsil Hazro.

- Ababakar
- Barazai
- Daman
- Hameed
- Hazro
- Jalalia
- Kalu Kalan
- Kamalpur Musa
- Khagwani
- Nartopa
- Pirdad
- Sirka
- Waisa
- Shamsabad
- Ghorghushti
- Malhoo
- Shinka
- Malak Mala
- Painda
- Mansar
- Haji Shah
- Behboodi
- Tajak
- Veero
- Saaba Kamala
- Basia
- Yaseen
- Kalu Khurd
- Lakori
- Salom khan
- Kudlathi
- Bara
- Rahmo Mararya
- Mallaah
- Walia
- Lundi
- Noor Pur
- Ghondal
- Madrota
- Taja Baja
- Sayden
- Darya Sharif
- Samaan
- Delawarabad
- Kudlathi
- Fateh Chak
- Kot Kay
- Momenpur
- Hassanpur
- Rangoo
- Shah Dher
- Daghra
- Pinjwana
- Dhrabi
- Adal Zai
- KhuraKhail
- ThiKrian
- Chachian
- Shagai
- Hattian
- Jatial
- Shah Por
- Mosa
- Waisa Kasi
- Raitla Mandi
- Shadi Khan
- Kalu Dabb
- Sarwana

°° Pehti

== Notable people ==
- Yasir Ali
- Zubair Ali Zai

== See also ==
- Chhachh
