= Usama Ali =

Pakistani cricketer (born 1998)

Personal information
- Born: 26 April 1998 (age 28); Karachi, Pakistan
- Source: Cricinfo, 3 January 2018

Usama Ali (born 26 April 1998) is a Pakistani cricketer. He made his List A debut for National Bank of Pakistan in the 2017–18 Departmental One Day Cup on 3 January 2018.
