= Momanpur, Bhopal =

Momanpur
- village
- Location within Madhya Pradesh Location within India
- Coordinates: 23.4326511°N 77.4570342°E
- Country: India
- State: Madhya Pradesh
- District: Bhopal
- Tehsil: Huzur
- Elevation: 473 m (1,552 ft)

Population (2011)
  - Total: 176
- Time zone: UTC+5:30 (IST)
- ISO 3166 code: MP-IN
- 2011 census code: 482400

Momanpur is a village in the Bhopal district of Madhya Pradesh, India. It is located in the Huzur tehsil and the Phanda block.

== Demographics ==
According to the 2011 census of India, Momanpur has 45 households. The effective literacy rate (i.e. the literacy rate of population excluding children aged 6 and below) is 80.43%.

Demographics (2011 Census)
	Total	Male	Female
Population	176	96	80
Children aged below 6 years	38	22	16
Scheduled caste	15	7	8
Scheduled tribe	0	0	0
Literates	111	69	42
Workers (all)	82	57	25
Main workers (total)	44	41	3
Main workers: Cultivators	37	36	1
Main workers: Agricultural labourers	0	0	0
Main workers: Household industry workers	0	0	0
Main workers: Other	7	5	2
Marginal workers (total)	38	16	22
Marginal workers: Cultivators	28	9	19
Marginal workers: Agricultural labourers	10	7	3
Marginal workers: Household industry workers	0	0	0
Marginal workers: Others	0	0	0
Non-workers	94	39	55
