= Sarwana =

Coordinates: 24°24′44″N 71°31′30″E

Sarwana सरवाना
- Panchayat Samiti
- Country: India
- State: Rajasthan
- District: Jalore
- Tehsil: Sanchore

Area
  - Total: 2,266.43 ha (5,600.5 acres)

Population
  - Total: 2,829

Languages
- Time zone: UTC+5:30 (IST)
- PIN: 343041
- ISO 3166 code: RJ-IN
- Vehicle registration: RJ-46

Sarwana is a village, gram panchayat and Panchayat samiti in Sanchore tehsil of Jalore district in the Indian state of Rajasthan. At the 2011 Census of India, the village had a population of 2,829 in 574 households.

== Demographics ==
According to the 2011 census, Sarwana had a population of 2,829, of whom 1,487 were male and 1,342 female, giving a sex ratio of 902 females per 1,000 males.

== Administration ==
Sarwana is the seat of its own gram panchayat and newly created Panchayat Samiti in November 2025. The village falls within the Sanchore Assembly constituency of the Rajasthan Legislative Assembly and the Jalore Lok Sabha constituency.

== Amenities ==
The village has a post office, a bank and a government health sub-centre, and is served by private buses. Also a police station of the Rajasthan Police is located in the village.
