= Waisa =

- Village
- Location within Punjab, Pakistan Location within Pakistan
- Coordinates: 33°56′N 72°23′E
- Country: Pakistan
- Province: Punjab
- District: Attock
- Tehsil: Hazro
- Region: Chhachh
- Time zone: UTC+5 (PST)

Waisa is a village in the Chhachh Valley in Attock District of Pakistan's Punjab province.

== Geography ==
The village is located within one mile of the south side of the Indus River. Waisa neighbours the villages of Kamalpur Moosa in the east, Tajak on the southern side, Shadi Khan in the west, and Sirka willage towards the northwest. The capital city of Pakistan, Islamabad, is located 60 miles east of Waisa.
