= Zubayr 'Ali Za'i =

Pakistani Islamic scholar (1957–2013)

Zubayr Ali Za'i زبیر علی زئی
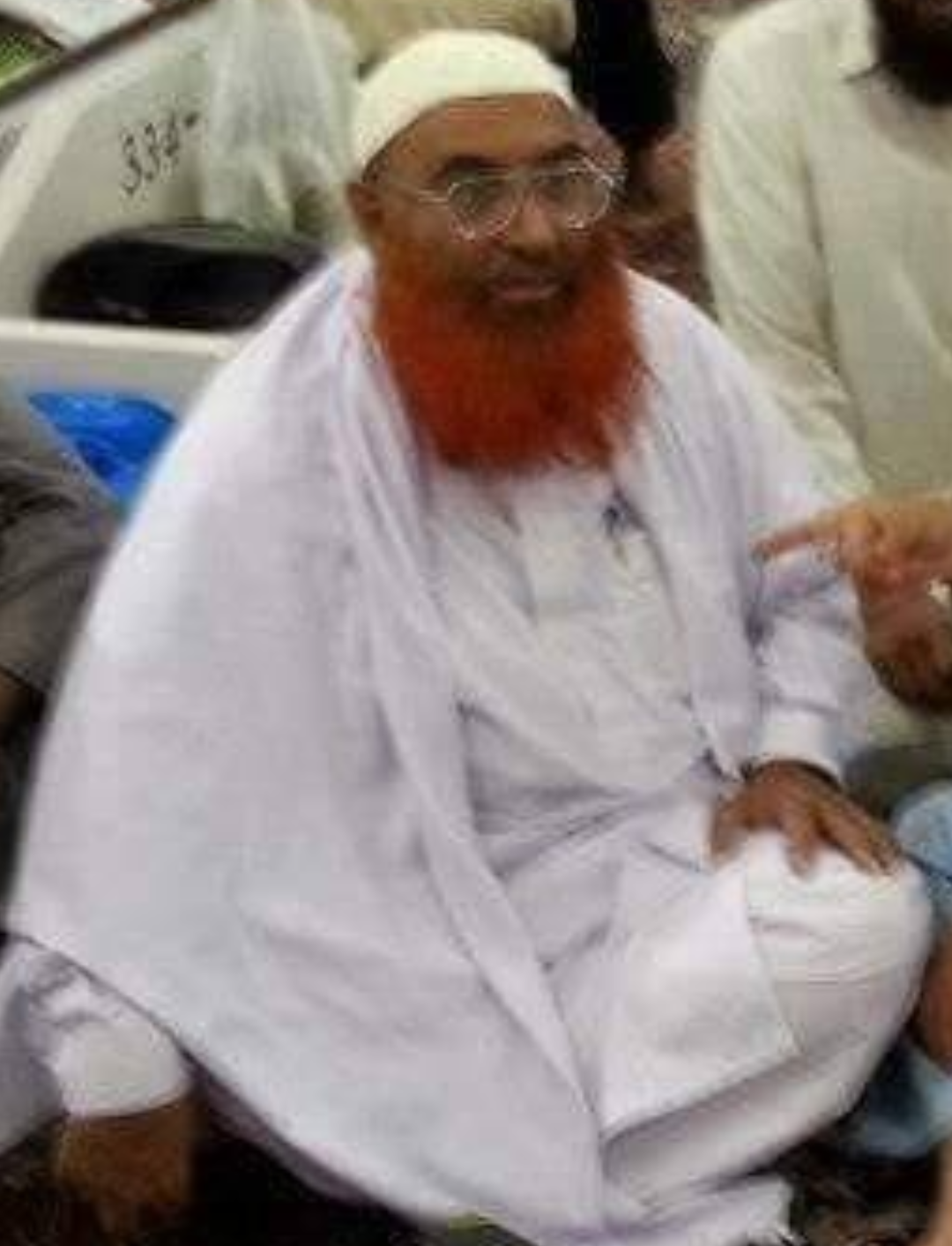
- Za'i in Medina
- Title: Al-Muhaddith al-'Asr

Personal life
- Born: 25 June 1957 Hazro, Punjab, Pakistan
- Died: 10 November 2013 (aged 56) Rawalpindi, Punjab, Pakistan
- Cause of death: Lung failure
- Resting place: Pirdad, Hazro
- Region: Punjab
- Main interest(s): Hadith, Ilm al-Rijāl
- Notable work(s): Anwar al Sunan Fi Tahqiq Aasar il Sunan, Anwaar ul Saheefah Fi Ahadees Zaheefa, Tabqaat Al-Mudaliseen, Kitaabul Zu'afaa, Musnad Humaidi, Muawatta, Mishqaat, Tafsir Ibn Kaseer, "Maqalat", "Fatawa ilmiya"
- Other name: Abu Tahir
- Occupation: Muhaddith, Faqih, Historiographer
- Website: zubairalizai.com

Religious life
- Religion: Islam
- Denomination: Sunni
- Jurisprudence: Ghayr Muqallid
- Creed: Athari
- Movement: Salafism/Ahl-i Hadith

Muslim leader
- Influenced by: Al-Albani, Badi' al-Din al-Sindi
- Influenced: Muhammad Ali Mirza, Nadeem Zahir, Ghulam Mustafa Zahir

Zubayr Ali Za'i (Note: Urdu: زبیر علی زئی, romanized: Zubayr ʿAlī Zaʾī}) (25 June 1957 – 10 November 2013) was a Salafi Islamic scholar affiliated with the Ahl-i Hadith movement in Pakistan.

== Life ==
Zubayr Ali Za'i was from the Pashtun tribe of Ali Za'i, itself a branch of the larger Durrani confederation, tracing their lineage to Ahmad Shah Durrani, founder of the Durrani Empire.

He was born in 1957 in the village of Pirdad, near Hazro in the Attock District of Punjab.

He married in 1982 and had three sons (Tahir, Abdullah and Muaz) and four daughters. In addition to his native language of Pashto and Arabic, he was also fluent in English, Urdu, Hindko and Greek, and could read and understand Persian.

== Career ==
=== Education ===
Zubair Ali Za'i completed a bachelor's degree and later on two master's degrees, one in Islamic studies in 1983 and another in the Arabic language in 1994 from the University of the Punjab in Lahore. Additionally, he graduated for a fourth time from the Salafi University in Faisalabad.

=== Editing and publishing ===
Ali Za'i was, like his former teacher Rashidi, a bibliophile, having amassed a private library of some renown in Hazro, where he spent most of his time.

== Works ==
Much of Ali Za'i work consists of editing and referencing ancient texts of prophetic tradition and evaluating them according to the Categories of Hadith. Working with Dar us Salam, he has reviewed the Al-Kutub al-Sittah, considered canonical in Sunni Islam. He also authored many books written in Urdu and Arabic. A book named "Noor ul Enain fi Masalate Rafa-ul-Yadain" has a list of all his works.

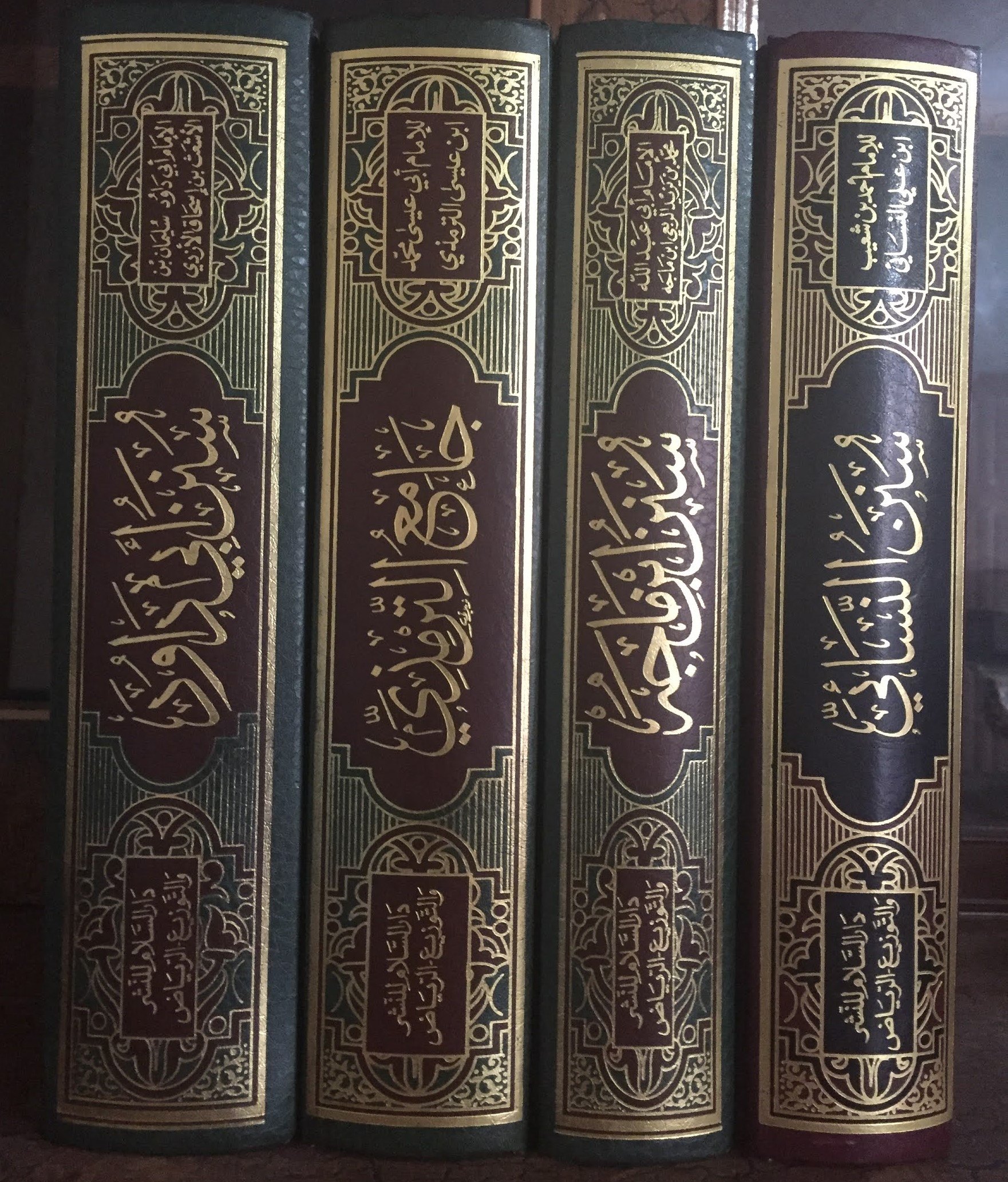
Sunan Arbaha Takhreej by Zubayr Ali Za'i

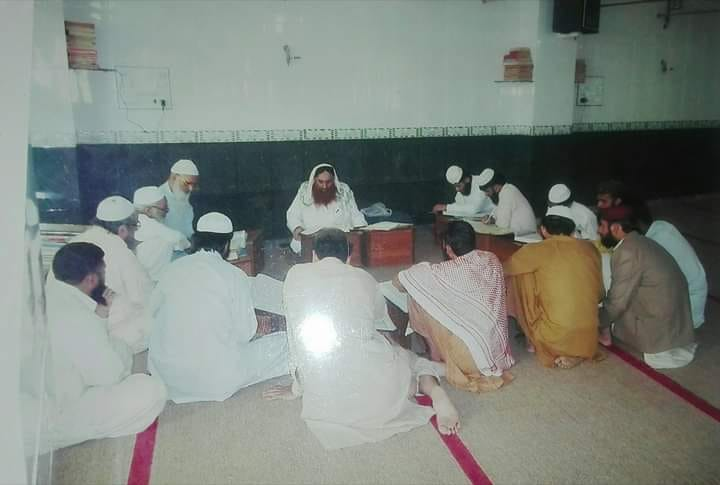
Teaching Sunan Abu Dawood - in 2012

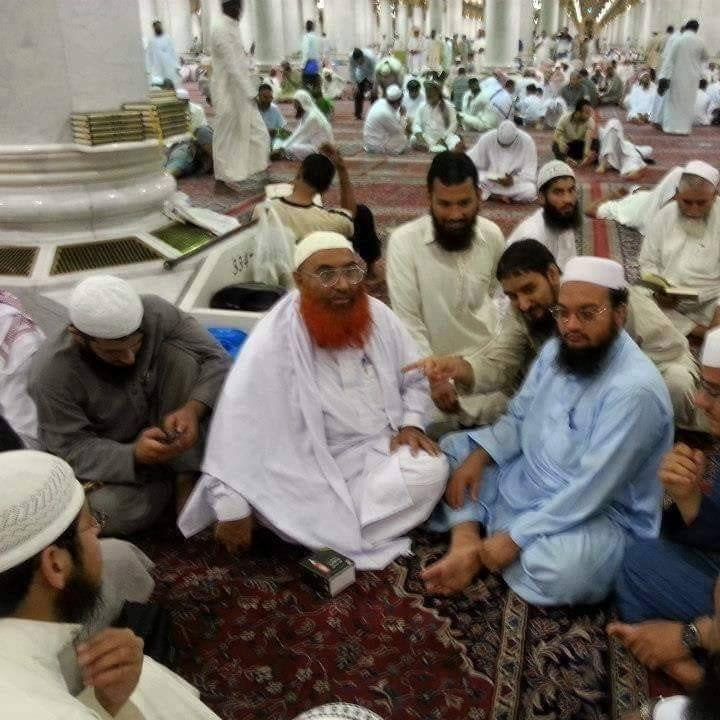
In Masjid Nabawi - during his last visit

Voice of Zubayr Ali Za'i

List of his books (published):

- Anwar al Sunan Fi Tahqiq Aasar il Sunan
- Anwaar ul Saheefah Fi Ahadees Zaheefa Min Sunnan e Arba'a
- Tohfatul Aqwiya Fi Tahqeeq Kitabul Zuhafa
- Tahqeeq Tafseer Ibn Kathir
- Tahqeeq Masael Muhammad Ibn Usman Ibn Abi Shaybah
- Tahqeeq wa Takhreej Juzz Ali Bin Muhammad Al-Himyari
- Tahqeeq wa Takhreej Kitabul Arbaʿīn Le Ibn Taymiyyah
- Al-Etihaaf Al-Basim Fi Tahqeeq wa Takhreej Muwatta Imam Malik Riwayatu Ibn ul-Qasim
- Tahqeeq wa Takhreej Hisnul Muslim
- Alfathul Mubeen Fi Tahqeeq Tabqaat Al-Mudaliseen
- Musafaha wa Mohaniqa Ke Ahkaam wa Masael
- Nabi Kareem ﷺ kay Lail wa Nahaar
- Taufeeq Al-Bari Fi Tatbeeq Al-Quran wa Saheeh Al-Bukhari
- Masla Fatiha Khalful Imam
- Juzz Rafahul Yadain
- Fazael Sahaba
- Noorul Enain Fi Masalate Asbaate Rafa-ul-Yadain

=== Hadith referencing ===
- Sahih Muslim of Muslim ibn al-Hajjaj. Riyadh: Dar us Salam Publications, 2007. 1st Ed. 7 volumes.
- Jami' at-Tirmidhi of Muhammad ibn 'Isa at-Tirmidhi. Riyadh: Dar us Salam Publications, 2007. 6 volumes.
- Al-Sunan al-Sughra of Al-Nasa'i. Riyadh: Dar us Salam Publications, 2008. 6 volumes.
- Sunan Abu Dawood of Abu Dawood. Riyadh: Dar us Salam Publications, 2008. 1st Ed. 5 volumes. Translated by Yasir Qadhi. ISBN 978-9960-500-11-9
- Sunan ibn Majah of Ibn Majah. Riyadh: Dar us Salam Publications, 2007. 1st Ed. 5 volumes. ISBN 9960-9881-3-9

== Death ==
Ali Za'i died on 10 November 2013, at Benazir Bhutto Hospital in Rawalpindi, of lung failure.
