= Hazro, Punjab =

Town in Punjab, Pakistan

Hazro حضرو
- Town
- Hazro city
- Nickname: حضرو
- Location in Pakistan Hazro (Pakistan)
- Coordinates: 33°54′35″N 72°29′34″E
- Country: Pakistan
- Province: Punjab
- District: Attock District
- Tehsil: Hazro Tehsil
- Established: 1008

Government
  - Prime Minister of Pakistan: Imran Khan (2018-2022) Shehbaz Sharif (Since 2022)
- Elevation: 1,184 ft (361 m)
- Time zone: UTC+5 (PST)
  - Summer (DST): +6
- Area code: 43440
- Calling code: 057
- Union councils: 14

Hazro (Hindko/Urdu: حضرو) is a town located in the Attock District of the Punjab Province of Pakistan.

== Geography ==
It is located approximately halfway between Peshawar and Islamabad, the federal capital. This town is the capital of Hazro Tehsil, an administrative subdivision of the district, and the central marketplace of the Chach Valley, consisting of 84 villages located along the Indus River.

== History ==
=== Ancient history ===
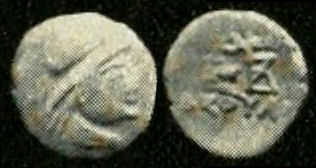
Coin of Liaka Kusulaka, an imitation of coins of Eucratides

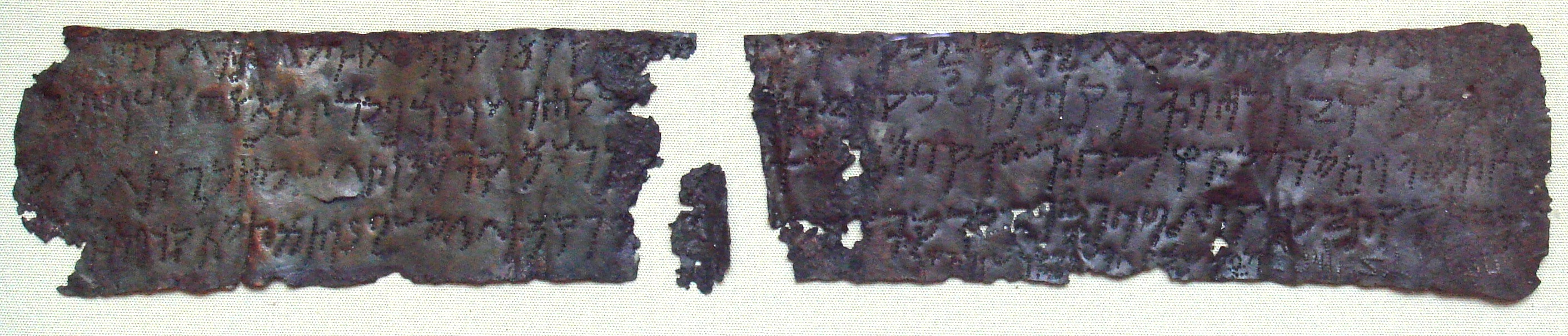
Liaka Kusulaka is mentioned in the Taxila copper plate (British Museum)

Hazro is located in the historical region of Gandhara. The region was inhabited by the Scythians. Liaka Kusulaka was an Indo-Scythian satrap of the area of Chukhsa (Chach) during the 1st century BC. Later the region was inhabited by Turk Shahis, Western Turk, or mixed Turko-Hephthalite and later was ruled by Hindu Shahis. Many rulers such as Alexander the Great, Mahmud of Ghazni, Timur, Nader Shah and Babur and their armies crossed the Indus River at or about this region in their respective invasions of India.

=== Middle Ages ===
According to the Gazetteer of Rawalpindi, Hazro was the battlefield during the Battle of Chach in which, in AD 1008, Ghaznavid Sultan Mahmud Ghaznavi defeated the combined forces of the Hindu Shahi ruler Anandapala with a slaughter of 20,000 men. The Gakhars became vital in the hills to the east, but their dominion never extended beyond the Margalla pass. Ghakhars were defeated by Kashmiri ruler Shihabu'd-Din Shah near Attock Khurd and continued under Kashmiri rule until the conquest of Babur.

=== Modern period ===
During British Rule the town of Hazro became part of Attock Tehsil; the municipality of Attock which was created in 1867 and the North-Western Railway connected the town to Lawrencepur. The town is surrounded by rich cultivation, and from 20th century had a flourishing trade, chiefly in tobacco and sugar. The population according to the 1901 census of India was 9,799.

== Notable people ==
- Yasir Ali
- Zubair Ali Zai
