= Qazipur =

- Union council
- Qazipur is located in Haripur District
- Interactive map of Qazipur
- Coordinates: 34°00′N 72°36′E
- Country: Pakistan
- Province: Khyber Pakhtunkhwa
- District: Haripur

Qazipur (Urdu: قاضی پور) is one of the 44 union councils, administrative subdivisions, of Haripur District in the Khyber Pakhtunkhwa province of Pakistan. Qazipur is located at 33°59'34N 72°36'11E and lies to the west of the district capital Haripur
