= Mahalla =

Country subdivision or neighbourhood

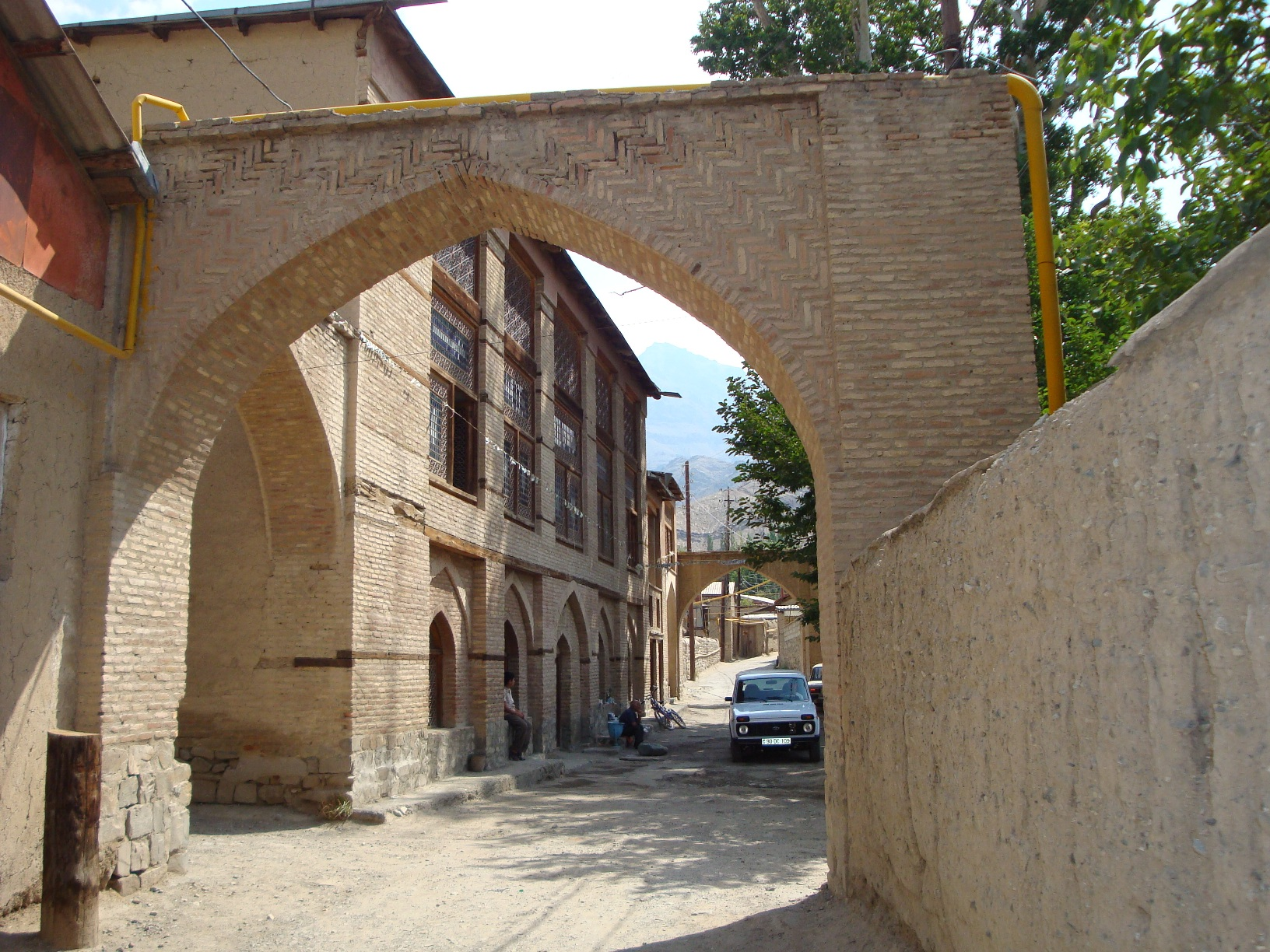
View of Sarshahar Mahallah in Ordubad, Azerbaijan

A mahalla (Arabic: مَحَلَّة, romanized: maḥalla, (Note: Arabic: محلة, romanized: maḥalla; Bengali: মহল্লা, romanized: môhollā; Hindi: मोहल्ला Urdu: محلہ (mōhallā); Persian: محله, romanized: mahalleh, maḥallä; Azerbaijani: Məhəllə; Albanian: mahallë or mahalla, or mëhallë or mëhalla; Bulgarian: махала, romanized: mahala; Greek: μαχαλάς, romanized: mahalás; Macedonian: маало, romanized: maalo or маала, maala; Vlax Romani: mahala; Romanian: mahala; Aromanian: mãhãlã; Serbo-Croatian: mahala, махала, or ma'ala, ма'ала, or only mala, мала; Turkish: mahalle) also transliterated as mahallah, etc. (Note: abbreviated: mh. or mah.)) is an Arabic word that comes from the root ḥ-l-l (ح ل ل), and originally denoted a place where one makes a halt. It has been variously translated as district, quarter, ward, or neighborhood in many parts of the Arab world, the Balkans, West and Central Asia, the Indian subcontinent, and nearby nations. In the Maghreb, it referred to a military formation or campaign for tax collection in the service of the sultan and his makhzen.

== History ==
Historically, mahallas were autonomous social institutions built around familial ties and Islamic rituals. Today it is popularly recognised also by non-Muslims as a neighbourhood in large cities and towns. Mahallas lie at the intersection of private family life and the public sphere. Important community-level management functions are performed through mahalle solidarity, such as religious ceremonies, life-cycle rituals, resource management and conflict resolution. It is an official administrative unit in many Middle Eastern countries.

The word was brought to the Balkans through Ottoman Turkish mahalle, but it originates in Arabic محلة (mähallä), from the root meaning "to settle", "to occupy".

In September 2017, a Turkish-based association referred to the historical mahalle by organizing a festival with the title "Mahalla" in the frame of parallel events of the 15th Istanbul Biennial. The festival in Istanbul features cultural initiatives of civil society and artists from the Middle East, Europe, the Balkans and Turkey. Against the background of the ongoing migration crisis, all participants of the festival focus their work using themes of hospitality, identity formation, homelessness, migration, fluctuation, the changing of an existing order and the dissolution of borders. The second Mahalla Festival took place 2018 in Valletta, Malta, in the frame of European Capital of Culture under the title "Generating New Narratives". The third Mahalla Festival took place in 2020 under the title "Wandering Towers" with online and physical events due to the COVID-19 pandemic. The 2021 edition, "Murmuration", took place in the Istanbul district of Kadıköy at the Yeldeğirmeni Sanat Merkezi.

== Origins ==
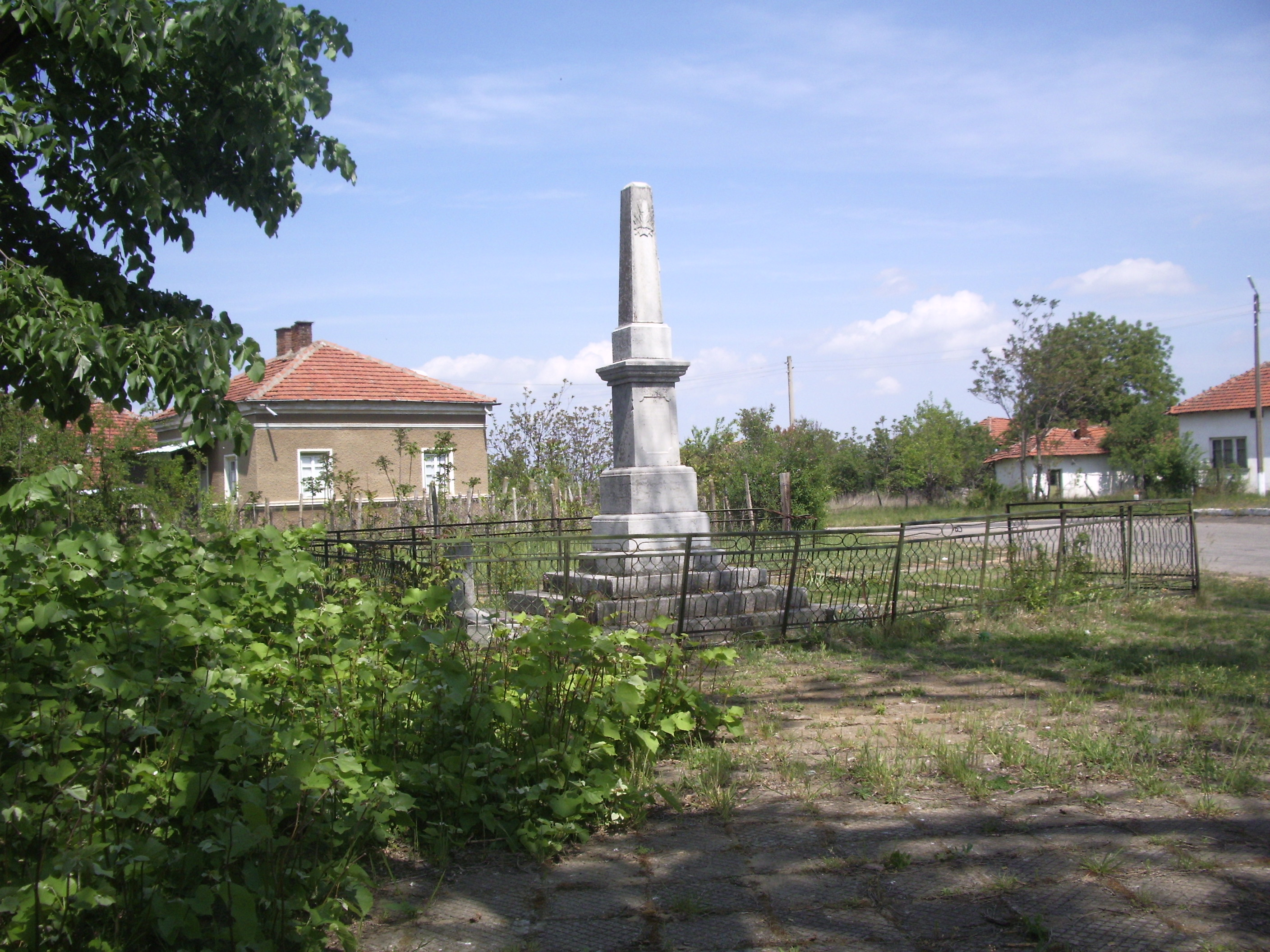
Dabova Mahala, a mahala-turned-village in Montana Province, Bulgaria

The word is used in many languages and countries to mean neighborhood or location and originated in Arabic محلة (maḥalla), from the root meaning 'to settle', 'to occupy', derived from the verb halla (to untie), as in untying a pack horse or camel to make a camp. In ancient cultures, hospitality involved welcoming a stranger at the host location and offering him food, shelter and safety. That demonstration of hospitality centred on the belief that strangers should be assisted and protected while they travel. A mahala was a relatively-independent quarter of a larger village or a town, usually with its own school, religious building or buildings, mayor's representative etc. Mahalas are often named after the first settler or, when ethnically separate, according to the dominant ethnicity.

In the Ottoman Empire, the "mahalle" was the smallest administrative entity. The mahalle was generally perceived to play an important role in identity formation, with the local mosque and the local coffee house as the main social gathering institutions.

Mahalle lay at the intersection of private family life and the public sphere. Important community-level management functions were performed by mahalle solidarity, such as religious ceremonies, lifecycle rituals, resource management and conflict resolution.

Today, the mahalle is represented in the municipality and government by its muhtar. The muhtarlık, the office of the muhtar, has been designed as the smallest administrative office, with representative and enforcement powers at the local level. In some cases, however, the muhtar acts as not only the representative of the government towards the community but also the head of the community toward the government and subverts official government policies by intricate face-to-face mahalle-level relationships.

== Use of the term ==
=== Bangladesh ===
A mahalla (pronounced mo-hol-la), is an Islamic congregation or parish. Typically, a mahalla supports a single mosque. An imam is seen as the spiritual head of a mahalla. Mahallas are directly subordinate to a city or town, especially an electoral district, for ritual and representative purposes. Unlike a ward, it is an optional and non-elective unit of a city corporation or municipal corporation. Mahalla also means an urban neighbourhood.

=== Bulgaria ===
In Bulgaria, mahalas were historically considered a separate type of settlement administration on some occasions. In rural mountainous areas, villages were often scattered and consisted of relatively separate mahalas with badly developed infrastructure. Today, settlements are divided into towns or villages, and the official division of towns is into quarters. It is used today almost exclusively to refer to the Roma neighbourhoods of towns such as Arman Mahala.

=== Greece ===
In Greece, mahalas (Greek: μαχαλάς) is considered a neighborhood, usually a worker neighborhood near a factory. Sometimes it is considered a distinct quarter of a small town or a gypsy neighborhood.

=== Hungary ===
The township of Szentendre lost most of its population during the Ottoman era, and was repopulated by various migrant groups from the Balkans - Serbs, Dalmatians, Bosniaks and the like. They built their own churches and created their own neighborhoods around them. They called them mahala or mehala, using the Ottoman nomenclature, and the word is still in use to describe these small quarters of the town today.

=== India ===
In India, the word mohalla is used in Hindi and Urdu to refer to a "neighbourhood". In the Malayalam-speaking Kerala state, the word mahal is traditionally used by Mappila Muslims to denote their village units. A typical mahal involves a central masjid coordinating the activities of religious establishments and Mappila Muslim families living in its geographical jurisdiction.

=== Iran ===
The "mahalle" is the smallest urban administrative division in Iran. Each city is divided into a few Mantaqes, (Persian: منطقه), which is then divided into Nahiyes (Persian: ناحیه), further subdivided to Mahalle (Persian: محله), usually having a Mahalle council (Persian: شورای محله), a quarter mosque, and a small parkette.

=== Maghreb ===
In the Maghreb, maḥalla referred to a military formation or campaign for tax collection in the service of the sultan and his makhzen.

=== North Macedonia ===
A maalo (sometimes maale), plural maala (Macedonian: маало / маале, маала) is a synonym for neighborhood in colloquial speech, but can also appear as part of a neighborhood name, such as Skopje's "Debar maalo", and Bitola's "Jeni maale", "Madzar maala".

=== Romania ===
In Romanian, the word mahala has come to have the strictly negative or pejorative connotations of a slum or ghetto that are not present (or not as strongly implied) in other languages.

=== Russia and the former Soviet Union ===
A mahalla is an Islamic congregation or parish in Russia and a number of countries, once part of the Soviet Union. Typically, mahallas support a single mosque. An imam is seen as the spiritual head of the mahalla. Mahallas are directly subordinate to a muhtasib and a territorial muhtasibat.

=== Uzbekistan, Kyrgyzstan, and Tajikistan ===
They were urban divisions in central Asian communities which today exist in Uzbekistan, Kyrgyzstan, and Tajikistan. Historically, mahallas were autonomous social institutions built around familial ties and Islamic rituals. Before the establishment of the Soviet rule in central Asia, mahallas fulfilled local self-government functions connecting the private sphere with the public sphere. Religious rituals, life-cycle crisis ceremonies, resource management, conflict resolution, and many other community activities were performed at the mahalla, in other words, on the neighbourhood level. An informal council of elders, called oqsoqol (or "aksakal") provided leadership.

After their inclusion in the Soviet Union, informal mahalla organizations were placed under the state control and served as local extensions of the Soviet government. Mahallas were thought to be "eyes" and "ears" of the Soviet government; mahalla became a control mechanism of the state. Mahalla leaders were then appointed by the government. Mahalla level state-society relationships were more complex, however, as their leaders could serve as henchmen as well as act as buffers between the local community and the state. Due to intimate, face-to face relationships dominant at the mahalla level, mahalla organizations could often shield the community from the incursions of the state.

Since 1993, the Uzbek government reorganized mahalla councils as bearers of "Uzbek nationhood" and "morality," effectively reproducing Soviet style state domination over the society. Thus, they are formal structures run by committees and once again regulated by the government.

Mahallas are a common unit not only in Uzbekistan, but in Tajikistani cities like Khujand and Kyrgyzstani cities like Osh.

=== Turkey ===
In Turkey, mahalle, which may be translated as 'neighborhood', was traditionally a kind of sub-village settlement, one that could be found in both rural settings and in towns.

== In popular culture ==
- Mahallada duv-duv gap, a 1960 Uzbek comedy movie
- "Viva Mahalla", a 2020 single by the Slovenian singer Senidah
- Mohalla Assi, (transl. "The Assi Ghat Neighborhood"; Hindi pronunciation: [moːɦəllaː əssiː]) is a 2018 Indian Hindi-language satirical drama film

== See also ==
- Mellah
- Corjova, Dubăsari

=== Notable incorporated mahallahs ===
- Mohalla Sadiqabad, Pakistan
- Shahi Mohalla, Pakistan
- Mahala, Podgorica
- El Mahalla El Kubra
