= Jalalia, Punjab =

Jalalia
- Village
- Location within Pakistan
- Coordinates: 33.97°N 72.54°E
- Country: Pakistan
- Province: Punjab
- District: Attock
- Tehsil: Hazro
- Region: Chhachh
- Time zone: UTC+5 (PST)

Jalalia (Urdu: جلالیہ) is a village in Attock District of the Punjab province of Pakistan.

Jalalia is one of the biggest village in Chhachh valley with a population of nearly 12,000.
