= Lawrencepur =

Faqeerabad
- Town
- Location within Pakistan
- Coordinates: 33°46′0″N 72°22′0″E
- Country: Pakistan
- Province: Punjab
- District: Attock
- Time zone: UTC+5 (PST)

Faqeerabad, formerly known as Lawrencepur, is a town in Attock District of Punjab Province in Pakistan. It is situated on the Grand Trunk Road.

The town is served by Faqeer Abad railway station.

The town acquires its name from a religious personality Faqeer Muhammad.

West of Faqeerabad, there is a mediumwave broadcasting station of Radio Pakistan working on 585 kHz with 1000 kW. It uses a 259-metre tall ARRT-antenna.
