= Yasir Ali (Pakistani cricketer) =

Pakistani cricketer (born 1985)

Personal information
- Born: 15 October 1985 (age 41); Hazro, Punjab, Pakistan
- Batting: Right-handed
- Bowling: Right-arm fast-medium

International information
- National side: Pakistan (2003)
- Only Test (cap 179): 3 September 2003 v Bangladesh

Career statistics
Competition	Test	FC	LA
Matches	1	86	59
Runs scored	1	1,311	365
Batting average	–	12.85	13.51
100s/50s	0/0	1/4	0/1
Top score	1*	129	51
Balls bowled	120	12,858	2,932
Wickets	2	258	86
Bowling average	27.50	24.43	27.66
5 wickets in innings	0	9	3
10 wickets in match	0	0	0
Best bowling	1/12	6/50	5/16
Catches/stumpings	0/–	27/–	19/–
- Source: CricInfo, 9 June 2021

Yasir Ali (Urdu: یاسر علی) (born 15 October 1985) is a Pakistani former cricketer who played for the Pakistan national cricket team in 2003 in his only cricket Test match. He was a right-handed batsman and a right-arm medium-fast bowler.

== Career ==
Ali started his career as an under-19 cricketer when he started playing for the Attock Under-19 team in the Grade 2 domestic competition. Due to his performances, he was selected in Pakistan Cricket Academy team's squad for the tour of South Africa.

In 2005, he made his Test cricket debut against Bangladesh at the age of 19. He became one of a handful of players in cricketing history to make their first-class debut and Test debut in the same match.

He now plays local cricket leagues in England and has participated in the North Staffordshire and South Cheshire League.
