= Behbudi =

- Village
- Location within Pakistan
- Coordinates: 33°55′32″N 72°31′44″E
- Country: Pakistan
- Province: Punjab
- District: Attock
- Tehsil: Hazro
- Region: Chhachh
- Time zone: UTC+5 (PST)

Behbudi or Behboodi is a village located in Chhachh Valley in Hazro Tehsil of Attock District in Punjab, Pakistan.
