= Chukhsa =

Ancient region in Gandhara

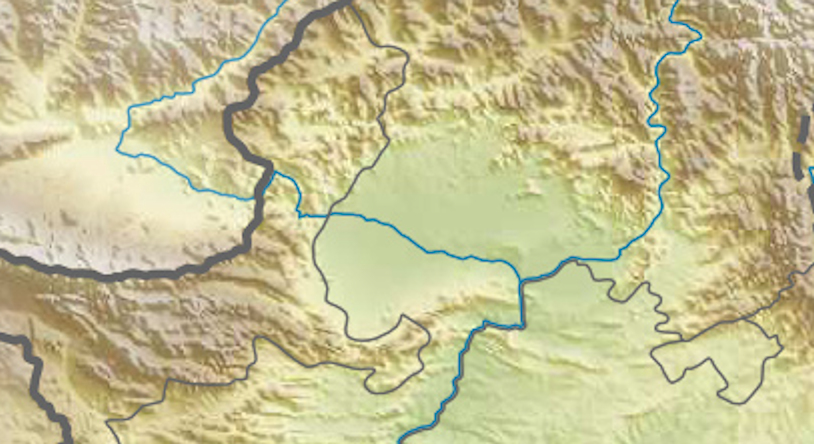
- Location within Pakistan Location within Gandhara
- 33°53′00″N 72°22′00″E
- Type: Region
- Location: Attock District, Punjab, Pakistan
- Region: Gandhara

Chukhsa (Hindko/Urdu: چخسہ) was an ancient area of Gandhara in Pakistan, modern Chach, west of the city of Taxila.

== History ==
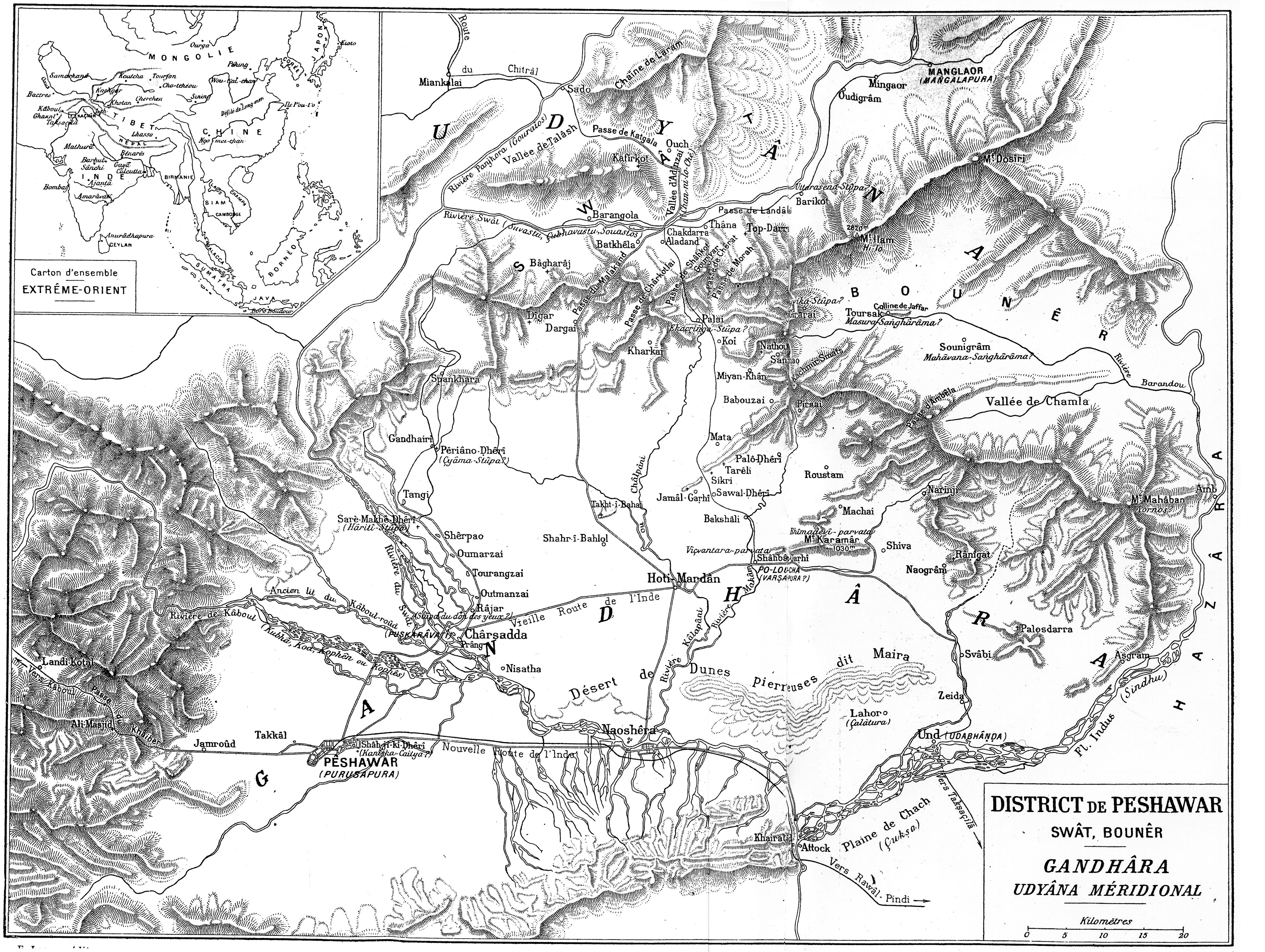
Chukhsa in south Gandhara.

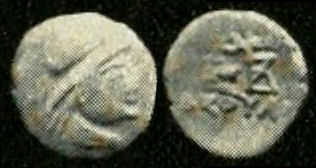
Coin of Liaka Kusulaka, an imitation of coins of Eucratides.

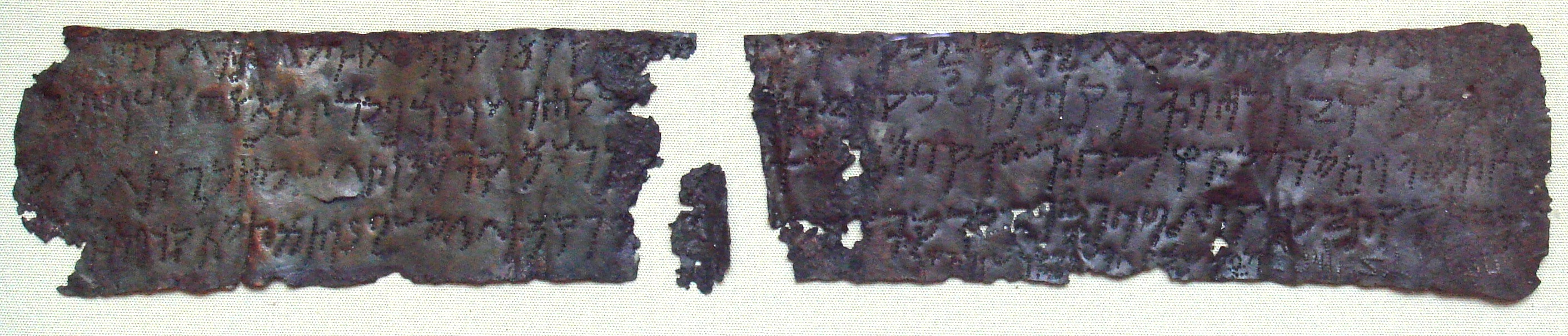
Liaka Kusulaka is mentioned in the Taxila copper plate (British Museum).

The area is mentioned in various epigraphic material, such as the Taxila copper plate inscription, where it is described as a territory of the Indo-Scythian ruler Liaka Kusulaka.

A silver jug found at Taxila indicates that Zeionises was the "satrap of Chuksa, son of Manigula, brother of the great king", but who this king was remains uncertain.

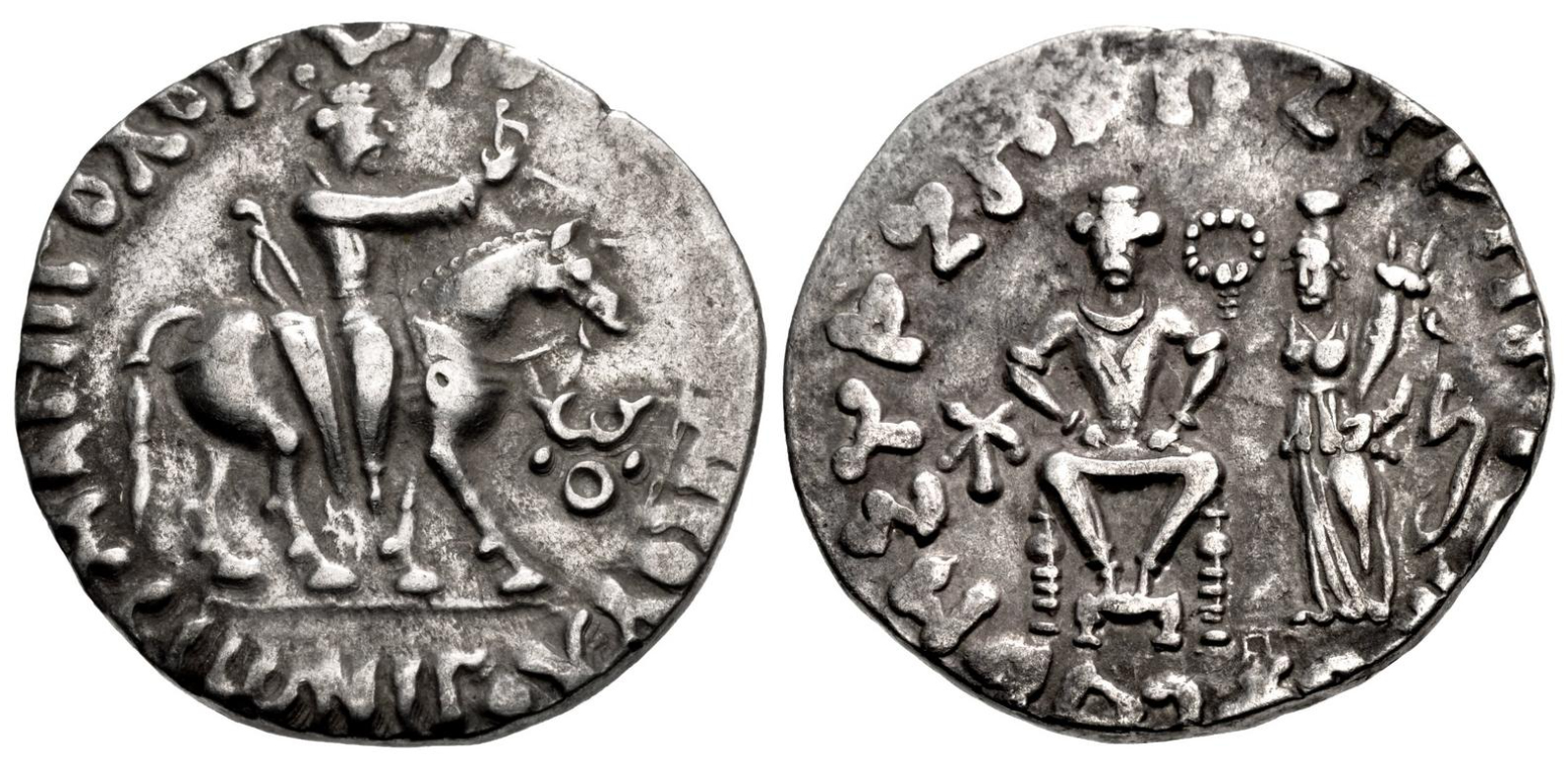
Indo-Scythian Zeionises. Circa 45-35 to 5 BCE. Uncertain mint in Chukhsa (Chach)

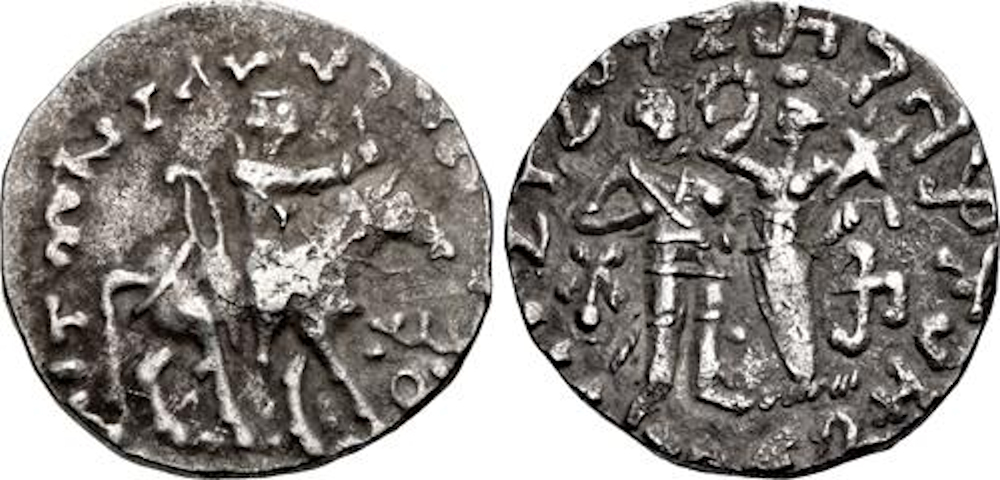
Coin of Zeionises (c. 10 BCE – 10 CE). Obv: King on horseback holding whip, with bow behind. Corrupted Greek legend MANNOLOU UIOU SATRAPY ZEIONISOU "Satrap Zeionises, son of Manigula". Buddhist Triratna symbol. Rev: King on the left, receiving a crown from a city goddess holding a cornucopia. Kharoshthi legend MANIGULASA CHATRAPASA PUTRASA CHATRAPASA JIHUNIASA "Satrap Zeionises, son of Satrap Manigul". South Chach mint.

The Battle of Chach was fought in 1008 AD between the Ghaznavid army of Sultan Mahmud of Ghazni and the Hindu Shahi army of Anandapala, resulting in the latter's defeat.
