= Taxila copper plate =

Taxila Copper Plate
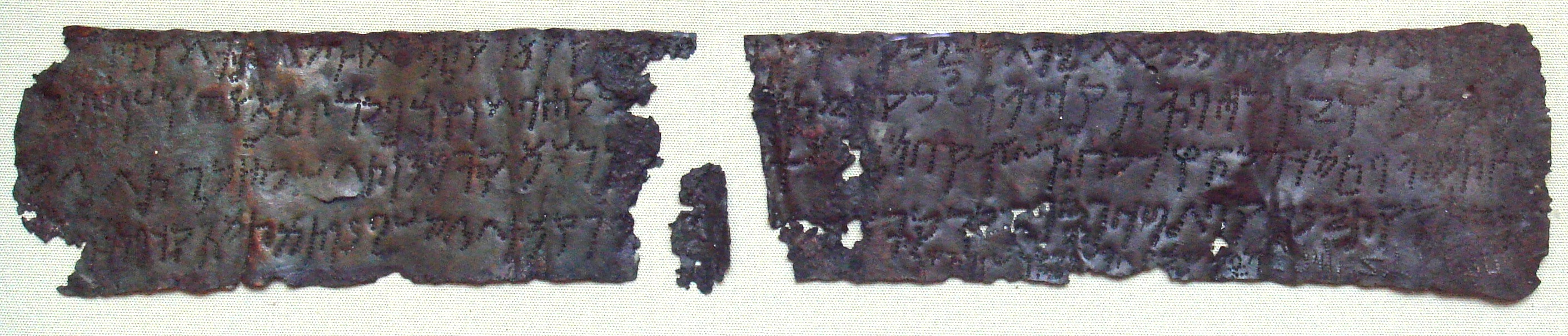
- Taxila Copper Plate as displayed in the British Museum
- Material: Copper
- Size: Height 7.5 cm
- Created: 1st century BC - 1st century AD
- Present location: British Museum, London
- Registration: OA 1967.10-18.5

The Taxila copper-plate, also called the Moga inscription or the Patika copper-plate is a notable archaeological artifact found in the area of Taxila, Gandhara, in modern Pakistan. It is now in the collection of the British Museum.

== Description ==
The copper plate is dated to a period between the 1st century BCE and the 1st century CE. It bears an imprecise date: the 5th day of the Macedonian month of Panemos, in the year 78 of king Moga. It is thought it may be related to the establishment of a Maues era, which would give a date around 6 CE.

The copper plate is written in the Kharosthi script (a script derived from Aramaic). It relates the dedication of a relic of the Buddha Shakyamuni (Pali: śakamuni, literally "Master of the Shakas") to a Buddhist monastery by the Indo-Scythian (Pali: "śaka") ruler Patika Kusulaka, son of Liaka Kusulaka, satrap of Chukhsa, near Taxila.

The inscription is significant in that it documents the fact that Indo-Scythians practiced the Buddhist faith. It is also famous for mentioning Patika Kusulaka, who also appears as a "Great Satrap" in the Mathura lion capital inscription.

== Text of the inscription ==
1 [samva]tsaraye athasatatimae 20 20 20 10 4 4 maharayasa mahamtasa mogasa pa[ne]masa masasa divase pamcame 4 1 etaye purvaye kshaha[ra]ta[sa]
2 [cukh]sa ca kshatrapasa liako kusuluko nama tasa [pu]tro pati[ko] takhaśilaye nagare utarena pracu deśo kshema nama atra
3 (*de)she patiko apratithavita bhagavata śakamunisa shariram (*pra)tithaveti [samgha]ramam ca sarvabudhana puyae mata-pitaram puyayamt(*o)
4 [kshatra]pasa saputradarasa ayu-bala-vardhi[e] bhratara sarva ca [nyatiga-bamdha]vasa ca puyayamto maha-danapati patikasa jauvanyae
5 rohinimitrenya ya ima[mi] samgharame navakamika
Reverse: Patikasa kshatrapa Liaka

— Original text of the Taxila copper plate inscription

In the seventy-eighth, 78, year of the Great King, the Great Moga, on the fifth, 5, day of the month Panemos, on this first, of the Kshaharata
and Kshatrapa of Chukhsa–Liaka Kusulaka by name – his son Patika - in the town of Takshasila, to the north, the eastern region, Kshema by name
In this place Patika establishes a (formerly not) established relic of the Lord Shakyamuni and a sangharama (through Rohinimitra who is the overseer of work of this sangharama)
For the worship of all Buddhas, worshipping his mother and father, for the increase of the life and power of the Kshatrapa, together with his son and wife, worshipping all his brothers and his blood-relations and kinsmen.
At the jauva-order of the great gift-lord Patika
To Patika the Kshatrapa Liaka

— English translation
