= Chhachh =

Pakistani alluvial plain

Chhachh چھچھ Chach
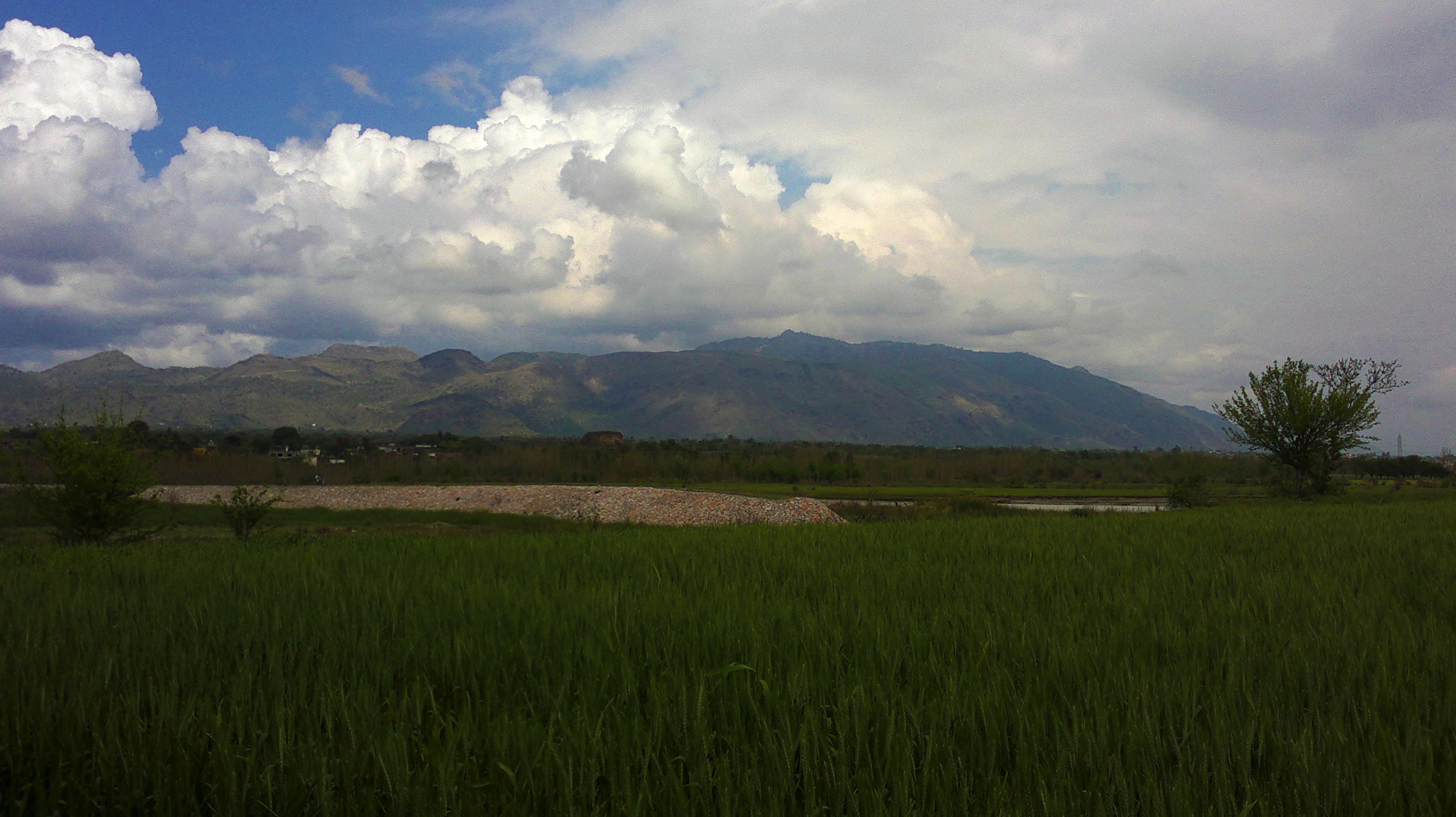
- A village of Chhach near Attock

- Location in Punjab, Pakistan Chhachh (Pakistan)
- Coordinates: 33°53′00″N 72°22′00″E
- Country: Pakistan
- Province: Punjab
- District: Attock District
- Tehsil: Hazro Tehsil
- Demonym: Chhachhi
- Time zone: UTC+5 (PST)
  - Summer (DST): +6

Chhachh or Chach (Note: Urdu: چچ, Punjabi: چھچھ) is an alluvial plain located in the northern Punjab, Pakistan. Triangular in shape, Chhachh is bounded by the left bank of Indus to the northwest, Gandghar range to the east and the highlands along the Grand Trunk Road to the south, covering an area of some 200 mi^{2} (520 km^{2}). Administratively a part of Hazro Tehsil of Attock District, Chhachh is reputed to be the most fertile in Punjab.

== Etymology ==
Chhachh has been identified as the Chukhsa country of Gandhara in the Taxila copper plate inscription. The area is mentioned in various epigraphic material, such as the Taxila copper plate inscription, where it is described as a territory of the Scythian ruler Liaka Kusulaka.

== History ==
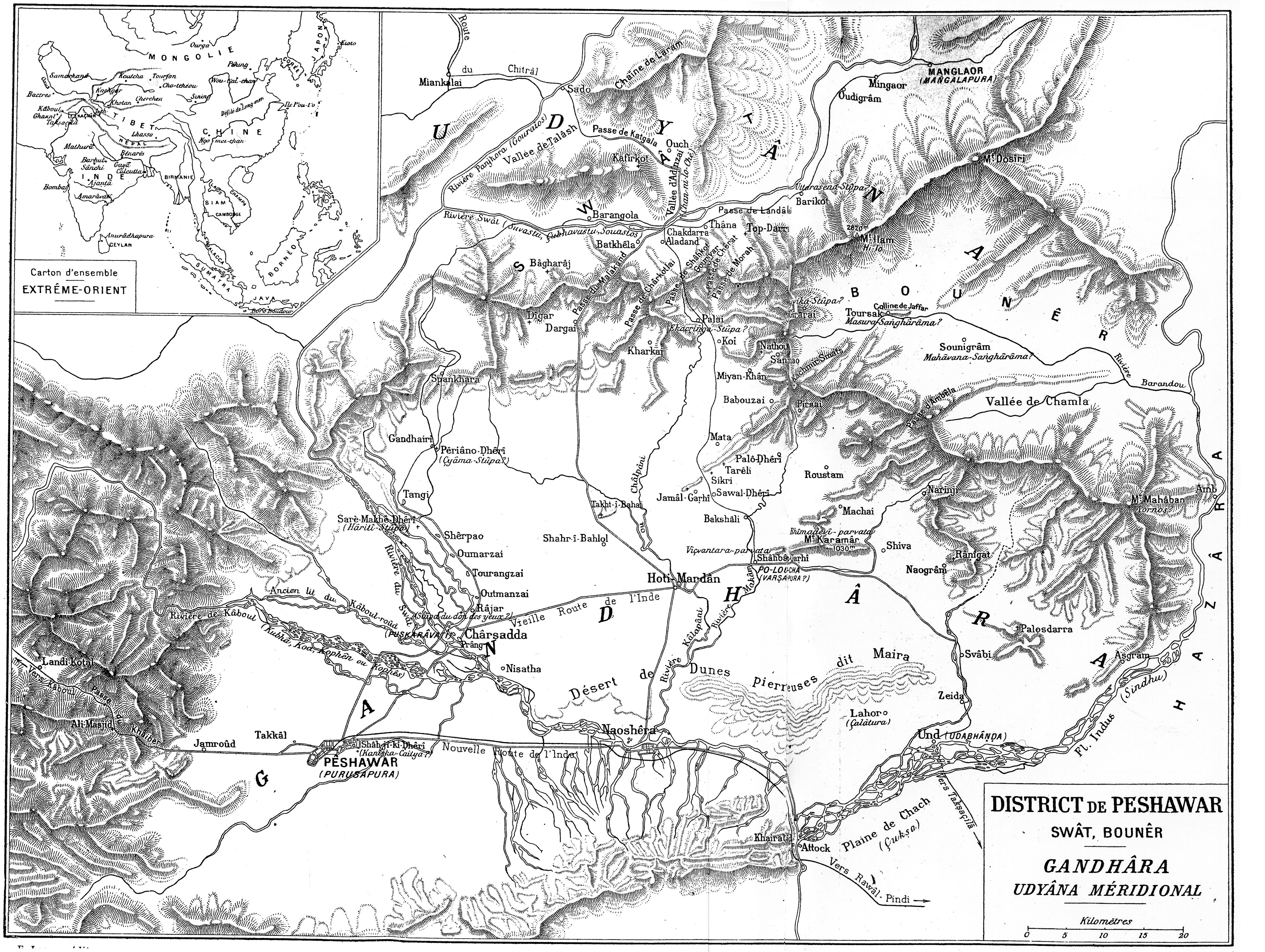
Chach Valley in south Gandhara.

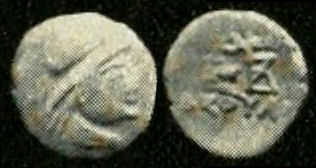
Coin of Liaka Kusulaka, an imitation of coins of Eucratides.

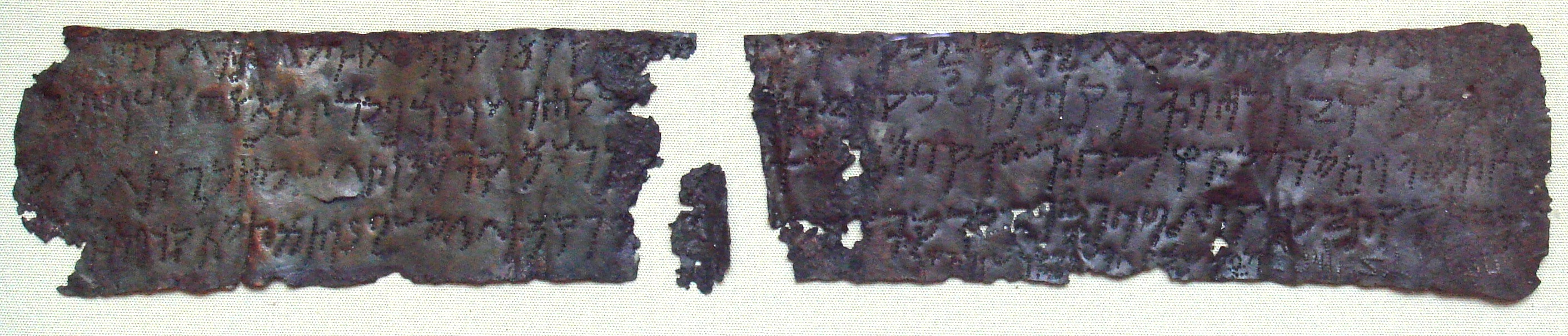
Liaka Kusulaka is mentioned in the Taxila copper plate (British Museum).

Chach has been identified as the Chukhsa country of the Taxila copper plate inscription. The Chhachh region is located at the historical region of Gandhara Civilization, the ancient Indo-Aryan civilization. Later the region was ruled by Kabul Shahis, followed by Hindu Shahis. Many rulers such as Alexander the Great, Mahmud of Ghazni, Timur, Nader Shah and Babur and their armies crossed the Indus River at or about this region in their respective invasions of India.

A silver jug found at Taxila indicates that Zeionises was the "satrap of Chuksa, son of Manigula, brother of the great king", but who this king was remains uncertain.

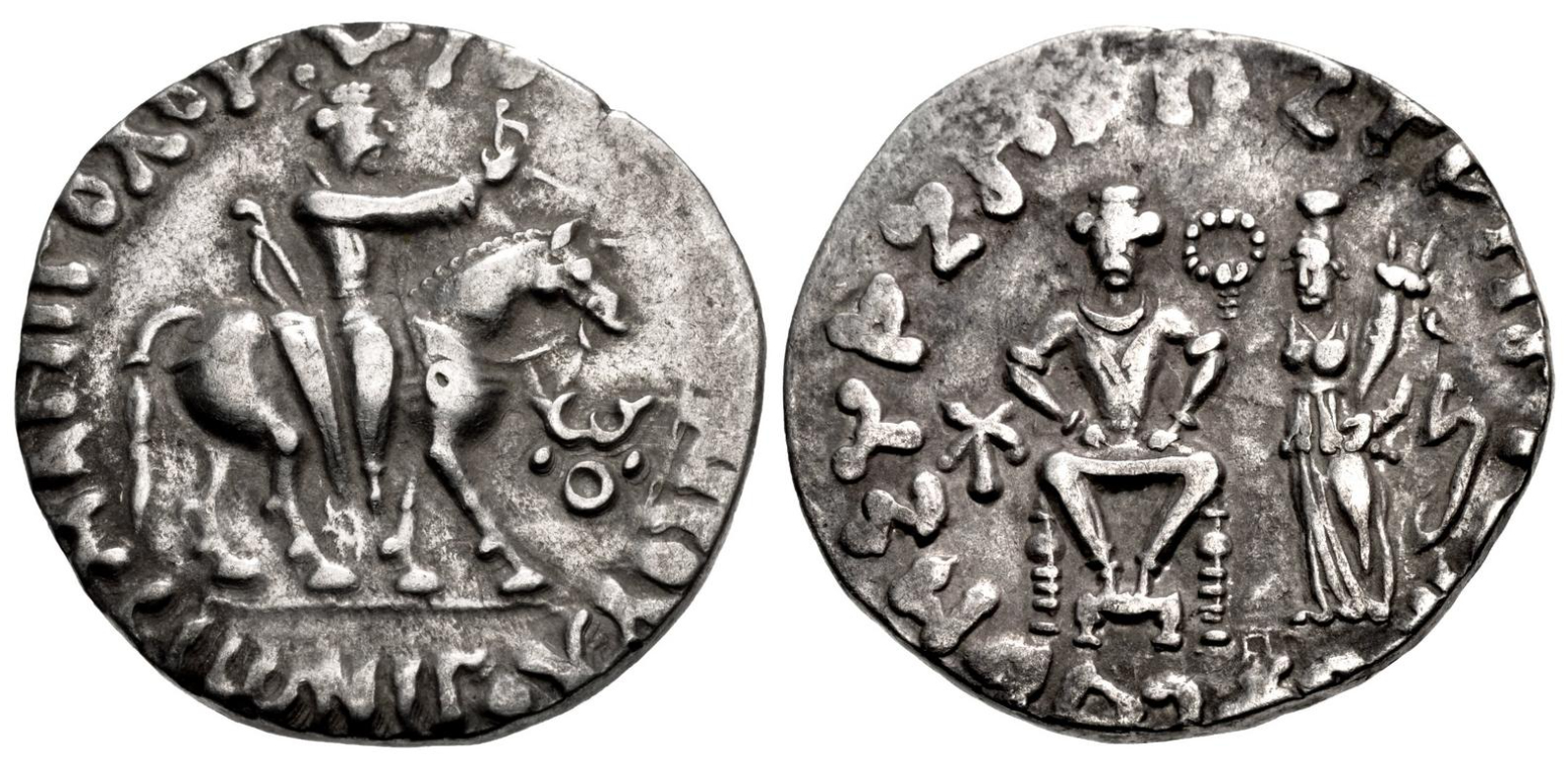
Indo-Scythian Zeionises. Circa 45–35 to 5 BCE. Uncertain mint in Chukhsa (Chach)

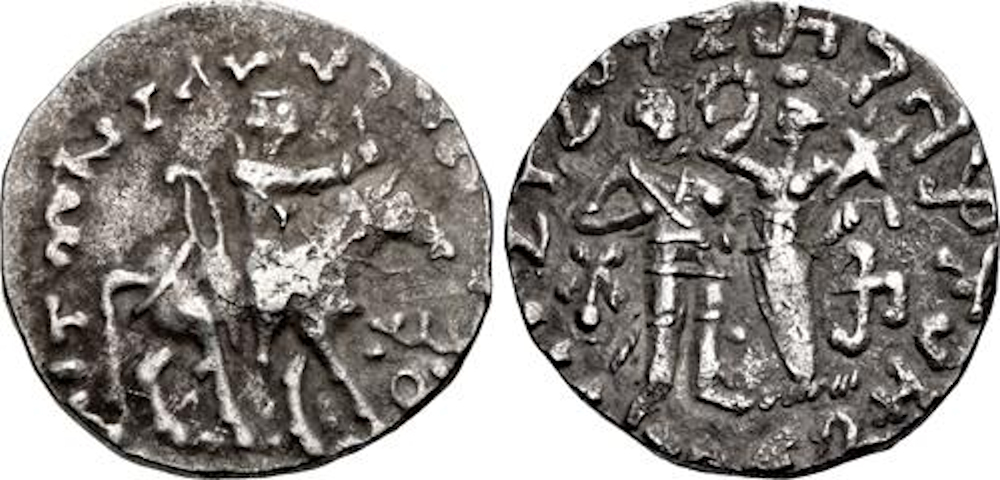
Coin of Zeionises (c. 10 BCE – 10 CE). Obv: King on horseback holding whip, with bow behind. Corrupted Greek legend MANNOLOU UIOU SATRAPY ZEIONISOU "Satrap Zeionises, son of Manigula". Buddhist Triratna symbol. Rev: King on the left, receiving a crown from a city goddess holding a cornucopia. Kharoshthi legend MANIGULASA CHATRAPASA PUTRASA CHATRAPASA JIHUNIASA "Satrap Zeionises, son of Satrap Manigul". South Chach mint.

The Battle of Chach was fought in 1008 AD between the Ghaznavid army of Sultan Mahmud of Ghazni and the Hindu Shahi army of Anandapala, resulting in the latter's defeat. The Gakhars became vital in the hills to the east, but their dominion never extended beyond the Margalla Pass. Ghakhars were defeated by the Kashmiri ruler Sultan Shihabu’d-din near Ohind and continued under Kashmiri rule until the conquest of Babur.

The Battle of Attock (also known as Battle of Chuch) took place on 13 July 1813 between the Sikh Empire and the Durrani Empire. The battle was the first significant Sikh victory over the Durranis.

During British Rule the region became part of Attock Tehsil; the municipality of Attock which was created in 1867 and the North-Western Railway connected the town to Lawrencepur. The town is surrounded by rich cultivation, and from 20th century had a flourishing trade, chiefly in tobacco and sugar.

== Geography ==
Chhachh is 7 km (4 mi) off the Pindi-Peshawar GT road. Chach is on the edge of Punjab's border with Khyber Pakhtunkhwa. It is 20.4 km from Attock city and 22.9 km from Topi, Khyber Pakhtunkhwa. It is bounded on the north and west by the Indus River and is about 19 miles (31 km) long (from east to west) and 9 miles (14 km) broad.

Chhachh is a plain which rolls from the Hazara-Punjab hills south to Kamra, and from east of the River Indus to the broken lands near Lawrencepur.

== Sources ==
- Cunningham, Joseph Davey (1918). A history of the Sikhs: from the origin of the nation to the battles of the Sutlej. London, New york: Oxford University Press.
- Jaques, Tony (2006). Dictionary of Battles and Sieges: A-E. Greenwood Press. ISBN 978-0-313-33537-2.
