= M-14 motorway (Pakistan) =

Motorway in Pakistan

M-14 motorway
- ایم ١٤ موٹروے
- Islamabad - Dera Ismail Khan Motorway Hakla - Yarik Motorway

Route information
- Maintained by National Highway Authority
- Length: 285 km (177 mi)
- Existed: 2022–present

Major junctions
- North end: Islamabad
- N-15 National Highway
- South end: Dera Ismail Khan

Location
- Country: Pakistan
- Major cities: Pindi Gheb; Tarap; Daud Khel; Mianwali; Yarik; Jand, Attock

Highway system
- Roads in Pakistan

The M-14 Motorway, or the Islamabad–Dera Ismail Khan Motorway (اسلام آباد – ڈیره اسماعیل خان موٹروے), also known as Hakla–Yarik Motorway, is a four-lane north–south motorway in Pakistan. The 285-kilometre-long (177 mi) motorway is a part of the Western Alignment of the China–Pakistan Economic Corridor, and offers high speed road connections between the Islamabad-Rawalpindi metropolitan area, and the southern parts of Khyber Pakhtunkhwa province around Dera Ismail Khan.

The motorway was originally planned to open at the end of 2018, but due to delays, was inaugurated on 5 January 2022.

== Route ==
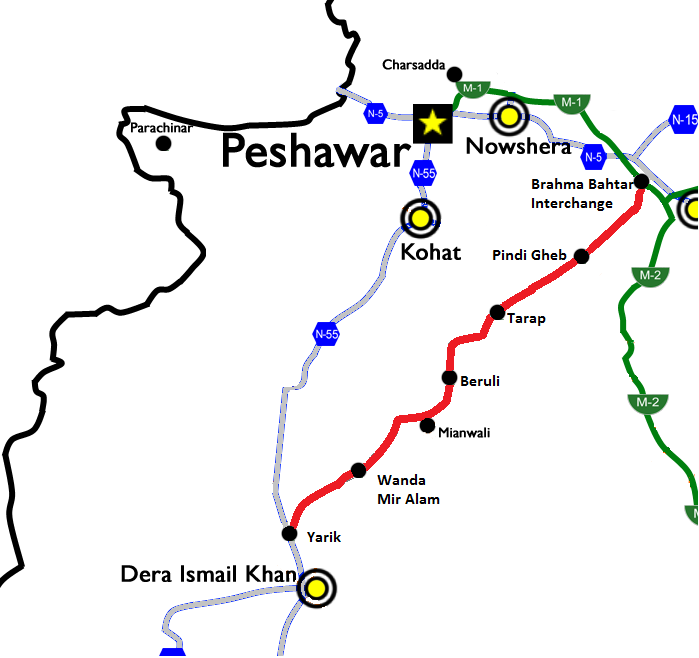
M-14 motorway (shown in red)

The groundbreaking ceremony took place in May 2016. The four-lane controlled access motorway extends from the Hakla Interchange on the M-1 Motorway, near Fateh Jang in Punjab, to Dera Ismail Khan in Khyber Pakhtunkhwa.

From Hakla, the motorway extends in a southwestern direction, passing through the towns of Pindi Gheb, Jand, Tarap, and Mianwali. The route transverses the Sindh Sagar Doab region, and crosses the Indus River near Mianwali before entering into Khyber Pakhtunkhwa. The motorway continues onwards before terminating near the town of Yarik, just north of Dera Ismail Khan.

At the southern terminus of the new Islamabad-Dera Ismail Khan motorway, the N-50 National Highway will also be upgraded between Dera Ismail Khan-Zhob and between Zhob-Quetta.

== Specifications ==
The motorway has 11 interchanges, 36 bridges, 33 flyovers and 119 underpasses. It also has a 100-meter-wide right of way in order to widen the four lane road to six lanes in future as traffic volume increases.

== Road safety ==
Various commuters have identified an exact spot on M-14 where multiple crashes had taken place until January 2022. As a result, the NHA initiated a technical investigation to discover any technical fault on the road surface. The investigation has turned up only over-speeding in rain as the cause of crashes in that particular section of the road.

== Construction ==
Pakistan's executive committee of the National Economic Council (ECNEC) approved construction of this section of roadway in April 2016, while construction commenced in May 2016. Construction was completed by December 2021.

Construction proceeded in five packages:

- Package 1: Yarik-Rehmanikhel section (contract awarded to M/s NLC).
- Package 2: Rehmanikhel-Kot Belian section (contract awarded to M/s SKB-KNK JV)
- Package 3: 55-kilometre (34 mi) Beruli-Tarap section (contract awarded to M/s FWO)
- Package 4: 62-kilometre (39 mi) Tarap-Pindi Gheb section (contract awarded to M/s Limak-ZKB JV)
- Package 5: 63-kilometre (39 mi) Pindi Gheb-Hakla Interchange section (contract awarded to M/s Limak-ZKB JV)

== Interchanges ==
M-14 Motorway Junctions
Interchange	Junction	km	West bound exits	East bound exits
Hakla–DI Khan Motorway	HDM	0	M-1 to Peshawar	Start of Motorway
Hakla–DI Khan Motorway	HDM	0	M-1 to Peshawar	Road Continues as M-1 to Islamabad
Fateh Jang Interchange		23	Talagang–FatehJang Road to Fateh Jang	Talagang–FatehJang Road to Gali Jagir
Pindigheb Interchange		62	Pindigheb Attock Road to Mithial	Pindigheb Attock Road to Pindigheb
Jand Interchange		73	Jand Pindigheb Road to Jand	Jand Pindigheb Road to Jand
Tarap Interchange		112	Jand Tarap Talagang Road to Inra T–Chowk	Jand Tarap Talagang Road to Tarap
Doudkhel Interchange		154	Mianwali Kalabagh Road to Kalabagh	Jand Mianwali Road to Daud Khel
Kot Bailian Interchange		166	Kot Bailian Road to Kot Bailian	Kot Bailian Road and Jand Mianwali Road to Mianwali
Isakhel Interchange		209	Isakhel Mianwali Road to Lakki Marwat	Isakhel Mianwali Road to Isakhel
Kundal Interchange		219	Lakki Marwat Chashma Road to Dara Tang and Lakki Marwat	Lakki Marwat Chashma Road to Chashma Barrage
Abdul Khel Interchange		292	Paniala Road to Paniala	Abdul Khel Road to Abdul Khel
Yarik Terminal		291	Start of Motorway	Road continues as N-55 – to Yarik, Dera Ismail Khan
Yarik Terminal		291	Road continues as N-55 – to Pezu	Road continues as N-55 – to Yarik, Dera Ismail Khan

== See also ==
- Motorways of Pakistan
- Roads in Pakistan
- Peshawar–D.I. Khan motorway
