= Akhori Dam =

- Interactive map of Akhori Dam
- Country: Pakistan
- Location: Akhori, Attock district, Punjab
- Coordinates: 33°42′23″N 72°26′34″E
- Purpose: Power, water storage
- Status: Proposed
- Construction cost: $1.6 Billion Est.
- Operator: Wapda

Dam and spillways
- Impounds: Haro River
- Height: 122 m
- Length: 5.16 km

Reservoir
- Creates: Akhori reservoir
- Total capacity: 9.4 km^{3}

Power Station
- Installed capacity: 600 MW
- Annual generation: 2,155 GWh
- Website; AKHORI DAM

The Akhori Dam project is a proposed multipurpose dam in Pakistan, about 60 km west of Islamabad. Developed by Pakistani Water and Power Development Authority (WAPDA) as part of its Water Vision 2025, it has been proposed by the former Pakistan Muslim League (Q)'s Government.

The dam will be able to store about 8.6 billion cubic metres of water that is split filling the Tarbela reservoir during the monsoon season. It will also host a 600 MW hydropower plant, expected to generate an estimated 2,155 GWh/year.

== Controversy ==
The local people of this area may be opposed to the proposal because they are small land holder agriculturalists, but the government continues to press on. Government officials claim locals though are willing to give up their land for the better of the nation. With the construction of the dam, as many as 49,320 persons would be displaced and the government would have to bear an environmental and resettlement cost of $0.3 billion. More than thirty villages including Daurdad, Akhori, Humak, Boota, Jabbi Shareef, and Bathou would be inundated.
