= Attock =

Attock اٹک Aṭṭak Campbellpur
- City
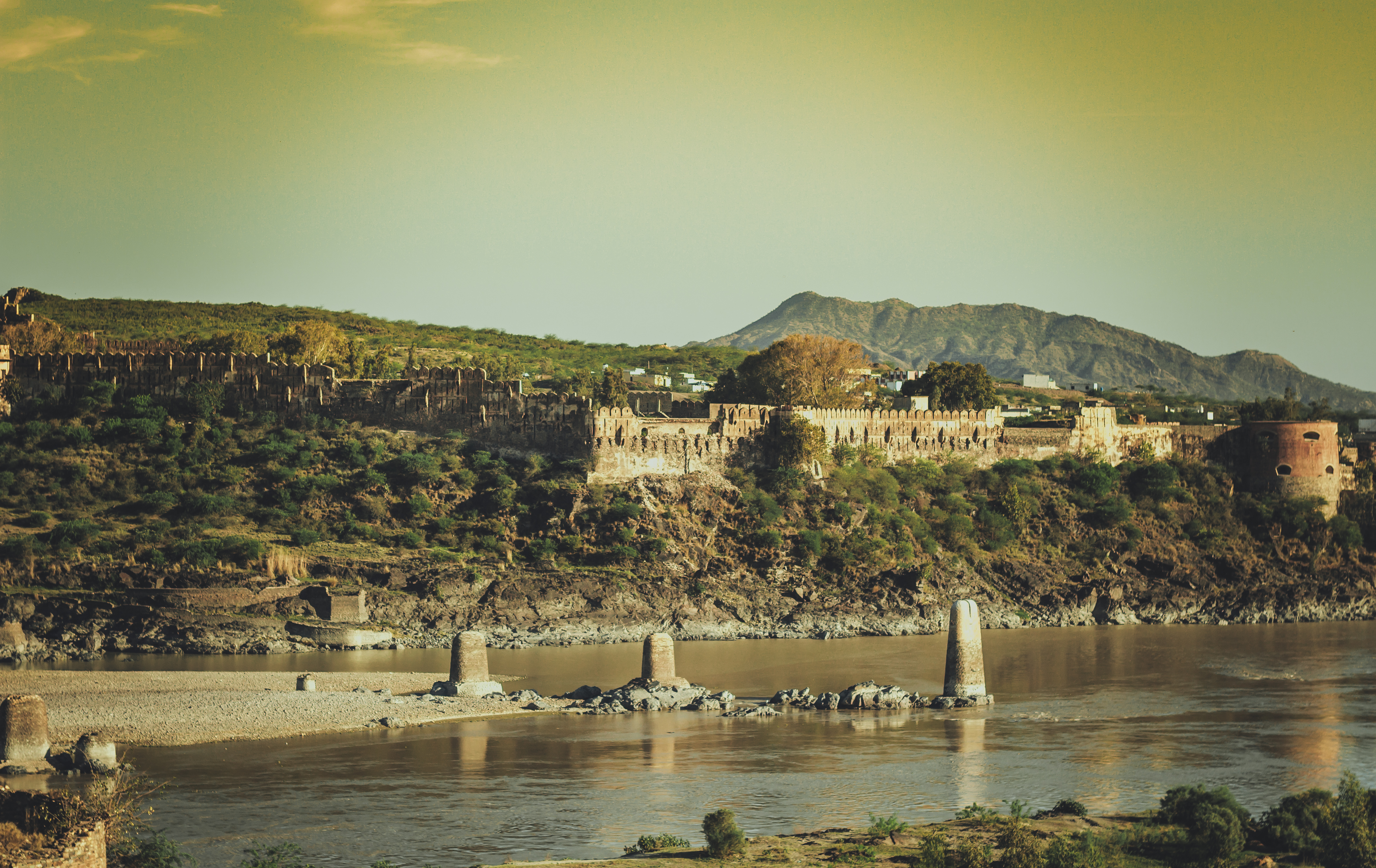
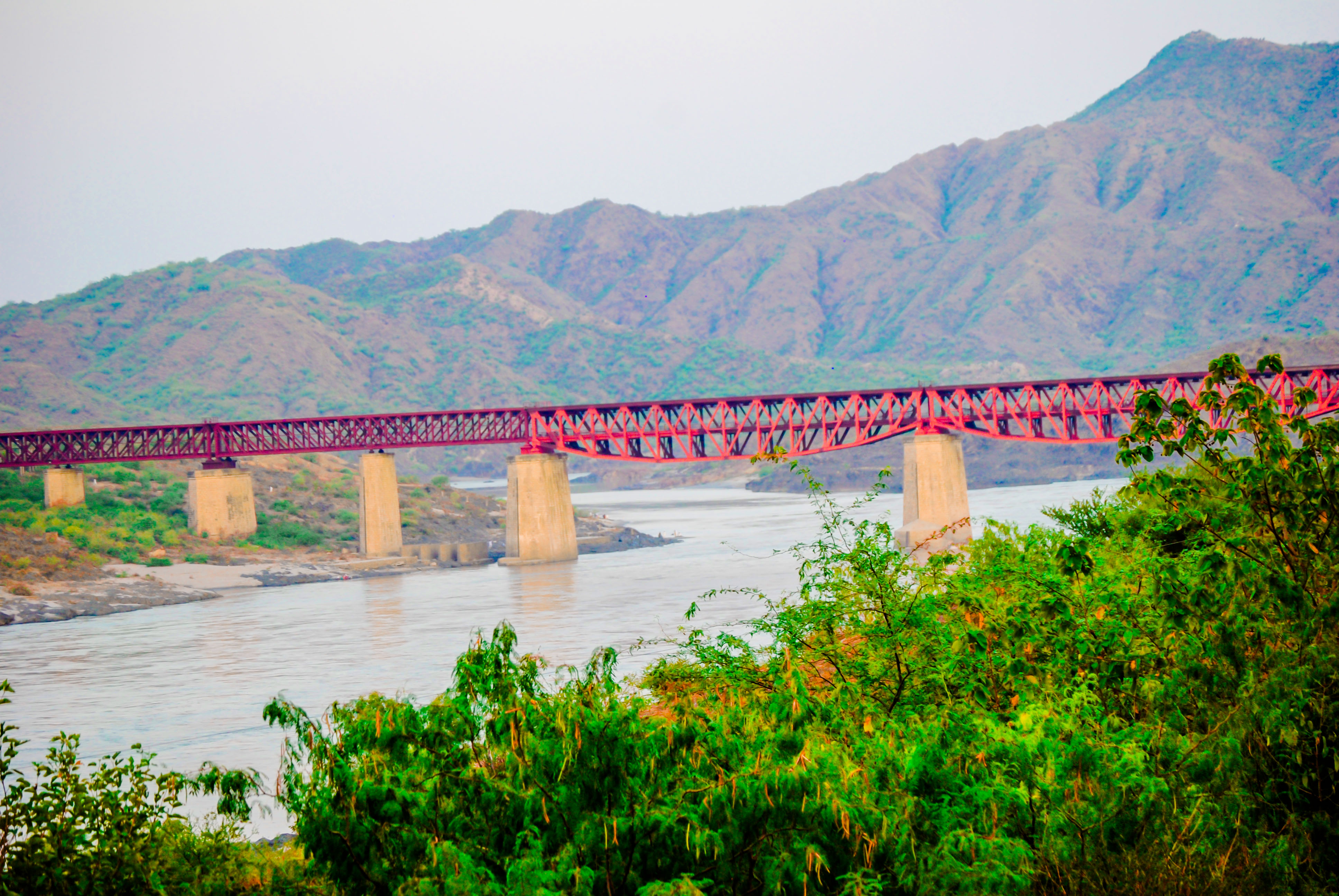
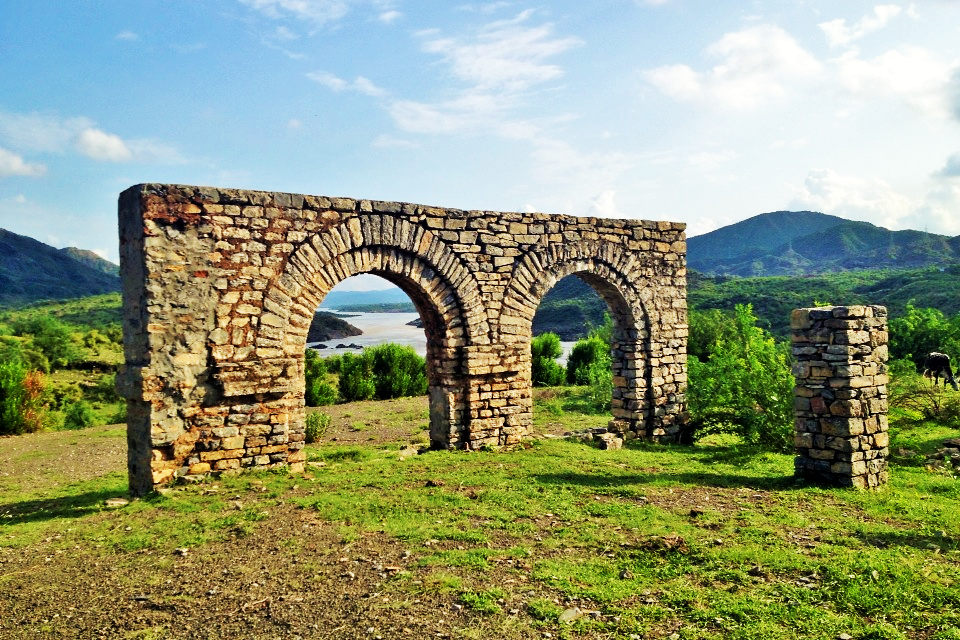
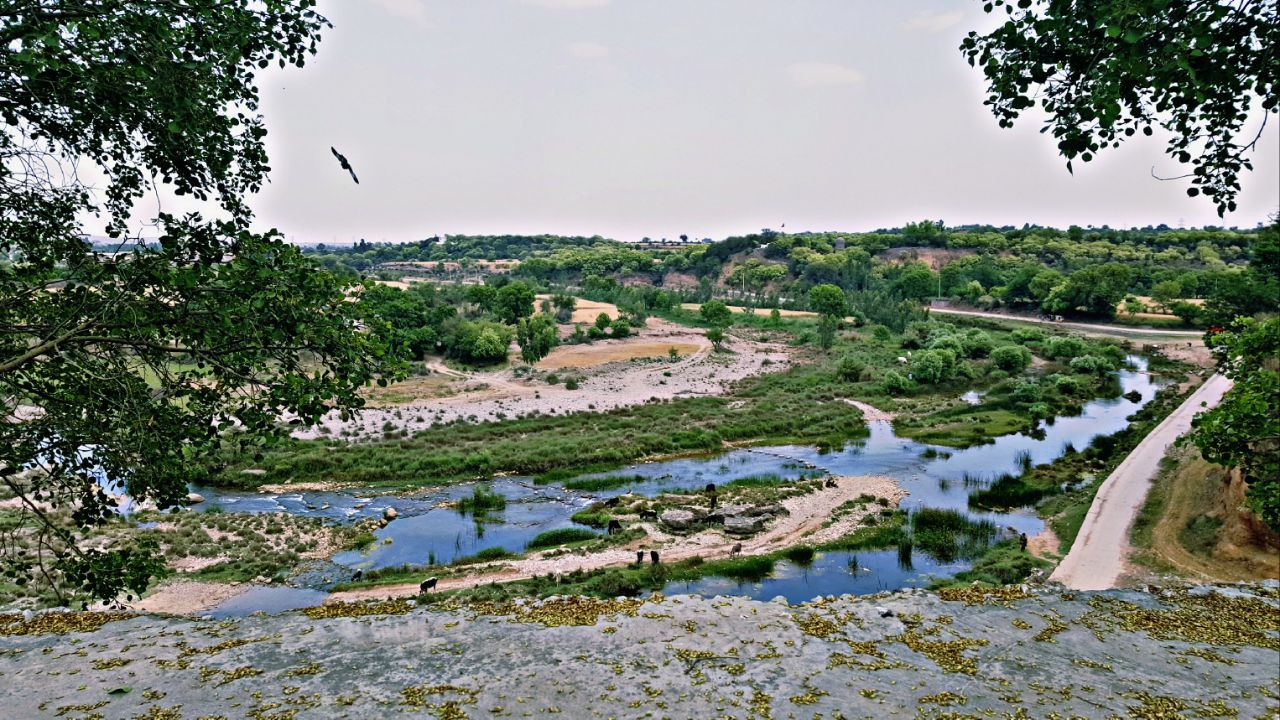
- From top left to right: Attock city view, Attock Fort, Attock River near Akhori, Attock Bridge

- Location within Punjab, Pakistan Location within Pakistan
- Coordinates: 33°46′0″N 72°22′0″E
- Country: Pakistan
- Province: Punjab
- Division: Rawalpindi
- District: Attock
- Established: 4 April 1904
- Incorporated: 1978 (Renamed to Attock)

Government
  - Type: Municipal Committee
  - Chairman: Nasir Mehmood
  - Vice-Chairman: Tahir Javid Awan
  - Deputy Commissioner: Rao Atif Raza
- Elevation: 355 m (1,165 ft)

Population (2023 census)
  - City: 176,544
  - Rank: 60th, Pakistan
- Time zone: UTC5 (PST)
- Postal code span: 43600
- Area code: 057
- HDI (2024): 0.815 (very high)
- Website: punjab.gov.pk/attock

Attock (Punjabi, Urdu: اٹک) is a city in Punjab, Pakistan, not far from the national capital Islamabad. The headquarters of the Attock District, it is the 36th largest city in the Punjab and the 60th largest city in the country, by population. The city was founded in 1908 several miles southeast of the historical city of Attock Khurd, which had been established by the Mughal emperor Akbar in the 16th century, and was initially named in honour of Sir Colin Campbell.

== Etymology ==
The name 'Attock' is the romanised form of the Punjabi word aṭak, which means 'blockade, barrier or obstruction', although it is also translated as 'skirt of the mountains', owing to the hilly landscape of the district. The city was initially founded by the Mughal emperor Akbar as Atak-Banāras (Urdu: اٹک بنارس). It was named Campbellpur after the Commander-in-Chief of British forces Sir Colin Campbell, who rebuilt the city. The name 'Attock' was revived in 1978.

== Demographics ==
Population

Historical population

Year	Pop.	±% p.a.
1951	17,671	—
1961	19,041	+0.75%
1972	29,172	+3.95%
1981	39,986	+3.57%

Year	Pop.	±% p.a.
1998	69,729	+3.33%
2017	146,396	+3.98%
2023	176,544	+3.17%

According to 2023 census, Attock had a population of 176,544.

=== Language ===
Urban languages of Attock Tehsil (2023)
1. Punjabi (62.4%)
2. Pashto (15.6%)
3. Urdu (12.2%)
4. "Others" (5.14%)
5. Hindko (2.12%)
6. Saraiki (1.19%)
7. Others (1.32%)

In the 2023 census 62.44% of the population spoke Punjabi, 15.58% spoke Pashto, 12.22% spoke Urdu, 2.11% spoke Hindko, 1.19% spoke Saraiki, while 1.32% spoke other national languages of Pakistan (mostly Sindhi and Kashmiri). Another 5.14% of the population chose "Others" for their mother tongue.

== Geography ==
Attock is located east of the Indus River, in the Pothohar Plateau, Geographically, the district is mainly hills, plateaus and river/stream dissected plains. The Indus River flows on the Northern and Western borders of the district. After Haripur, the Haro River passes through the North of the tehsil of Attock where there is a floodplain with fertile soil between 2 mountain ranges, this is where Attock city itself is located. Elevation varies with many of the plains being 300-600m above sea level while the hills and ranges reach upwards of 1200m above sea level. The range south of the city is called the Kala Chitta Mountain Range while the one north of the city is known as Gandghar.

The city is located at a distance of 80 km (50 mi) from Rawalpindi, 100 km (62 mi) from Peshawar, and 10 km (6 mi) from the Pakistan Aeronautical Complex, Kamra.

== History ==
=== Ancient period ===
Attock is located in the historical region of Gandhara. Alexander the Great, Mahmud of Ghazni, Timur, Nader Shah and Babur crossed the Indus at or about this spot (Attock Fort) in their invasions of Indian subcontinent.

After the founding of the city by the Mughal emperor Akbar, the construction of Attock Fort was completed in 1583 under the supervision of Khawaja Shamsuddin, a minister of Akbar. During the Mughal era, Attock was part of the Lahore Subah of Punjab.

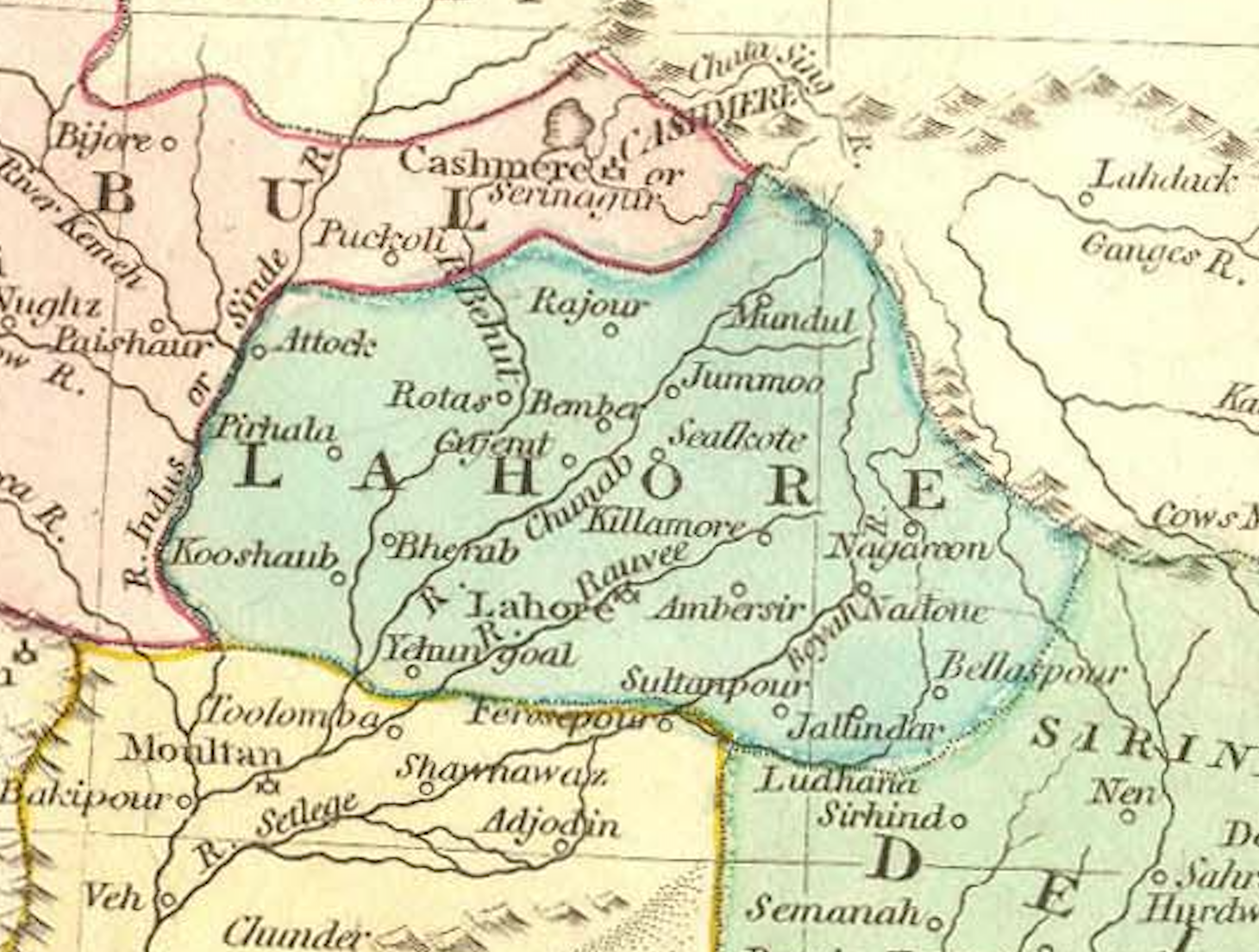
Attock in the Lahore Subah, depicted in map of Mughal India by Robert Wilkinson (1805)

Nader Shah crossed through Attock when he defeated the Mughals at the Battle of Karnal and thus ended Mughal power in Northern India.

Attock was then occupied by the Marathas in 1758 but this conquest was short-lived as Ahmad Shah Durrani came in person to recapture Attock and checked the Maratha advance after destroying their forces at Panipat. The Sikh Empire (1799–1849) under maharaja Ranjit Singh (1780–1839) captured the fortress of Attock in 1813 from the Durrani Nawab. After the occupation of Kashmir by Sikh Empire in 1820 many Kashmiris migrated to the plains of Attock.

In February 1849, Attock Khurd (Old Attock) was conquered by the British East India Company who created Campbellpur District. Following the Indian Rebellion in 1857, the region's strategic value was appreciated by the British, who established the Campbellpur Cantonment in 1857–58.

=== Modern Period ===
The Campbellpur Cantonment was established by the British colonial rulers in 1858. Campbellpur District was organised in 1904, by the division of Talagang Tehsil in the Jhelum District with the Pindigheb, Fateh Jang and Attock tehsils from Rawalpindi District. Today the Attock district consists of six tehsils: Fateh Jang, Hazro, Hassan Abdal, Jand, and Pindi Gheb.

The city's foundations were laid in 1908 and the city was named after Sir Colin Campbell, British Commander-in-Chief of India. The old city was established near the 16th century near the Attock fort that had guarded the major routes between Central Asia and South Asia. Attock's first oil well was drilled in Khaur in 1915, while the Attock Oil Company was established with a selling arrangement with the Burmah Oil Company. During 1928, the region produced 350,000 barrels of oil.

Attock was one of the northernmost points of the Punjab Province of British India prior to the partition; it thus found itself being a part of the common Hindi-Urdu phrase used to describe the length of colonial India: "Attock se Cuttack" (from Attock to Cuttack). The term "Attock se Cuttack" was first used to describe the extent of the Maratha Empire after they conquered Cuttack in 1750 and Attock in 1758.

After the independence of Pakistan in 1947, Hindu and Sikh minorities emigrated to India, while Muslim refugees from India settled in Attock. The Government of Pakistan renamed Campbellpur as Attock in 1978. The city and surrounding area are known for their high representation among soldiers of the Pakistan Army.

== Education ==
According to the Alif Ailaan Pakistan District Education Rankings 2019, Attock is ranked 3 out of 146 districts of Pakistan in terms of the quality of education. For facilities and infrastructure, the district is ranked 17 out of 146. A detailed picture of the district's education performance is also available online.

Notable institutions include:-

- Air University Aerospace and Aviation Campus Kamra
- COMSATS University Islamabad

== Climate ==
Attock has a humid subtropical climate (Köppen: Cwa) which has hot and humid summers, and cold to mild winters.

== Sports ==
- Indus Golf Club
- PAC Golf Club

== See also ==
- Battle of Attock, 1813
- Taank Kingdom
