= Akhori =

- Union Council
- Location within Pakistan
- Coordinates: 33°41′33″N 72°27′12″E
- Country: Pakistan
- Province: Punjab
- District: Attock

Population (2017)
  - Total: 6,743 (village); 8,676 (Union Council)
- Time zone: UTC+5 (PST)

Akhori is a village and union council in Attock District of Punjab Province in Pakistan. It is located between Attock and Fateh Jang. It is 15 km from Attock District and 26 km from Fateh Jang Tehsil. It is close to Kala Chitta Range and Nandna stream flows across it.

Akhori Union Council in Attock District has six villages, including Boota, Dhok Mahmoodabad, Dhok Sawin, Pata, Tobra, Dhok Mochian.
