= Pind Sultani =

- Village
- Location within Pakistan
- Coordinates: 33°41′33″N 72°27′12″E
- Country: Pakistan
- Province: Punjab
- District: Attock
- Tehsil: Jand

Area
  - Total: 44 km^{2} (17 sq mi)

Population
  - Total: 18,000
- Time zone: UTC+5 (PST)

Pind Sultani, is a village in Attock District, Punjab, Pakistan. It is located approximately 100 kilometers from Rawalpindi/Islamabad. With a total area of 85,949 Kenal, Pind Sultani encompasses the region of the Kala Chitta mountain.
