= Sulemanadbad =

Sulemanadbad is a village located in Jand Tehsil, Attock district of Punjab, Pakistan. The village is near the Kala Chitta Range. The range thrusts eastward across the Potohar plateau towards Rawalpindi.
