= Jhamat, Attock =

- Interactive map of Jhamat, Attock
- Coordinates: 33°17′33″N 71°53′20″E
- Country: Pakistan
- City Council: Lahore
- Towns: 10

Population (2014)
  - Total: 3,000
- Time zone: UTC+5 (PKT)
- Postal code: 43070

Jhamat is a village in the Attock District, in the Northeastern region of Punjab, Pakistan. It is 26.5 km from Jand tehsil, 60 km from Pindigheb and 149 km west of Islamabad.

Its population is between 2,000 and 3,000. The people speak Pahari-Pothwari. The area is known for resident's shalwar kameez dress.

Before 1947 a significant non-Muslim population made up approximately 30 percent of the total. This group migrated to India after the Partition of India.
