= Dhari Rai Ditta =

- Village
- Location within Pakistan
- Coordinates: 33°25′4″N 72°44′16″E
- Country: Pakistan
- Province: Punjab
- District: Attock
- Tehsil: Fateh Jang
- Time zone: UTC+5 (PST)

Dhari Rai Ditta is a village in Fateh Jang Tehsil of Attock District in Punjab Province of Pakistan.
