= Daurdad =

- Village
- Location within Pakistan
- Coordinates: 33°43′41″N 72°31′41″E
- Country: Pakistan
- Province: Punjab
- District: Attock
- Tehsil: Attock

Population (2017)
  - Total: 1,994
- Time zone: UTC+5 (PST)

Daūrdād is a village in Attock Tehsil of Attock District in the Punjab Province of Pakistan. It is located some 23 kilometres northeast of Attock City.

Akhori Dam, one of the proposed dams of Northern Pakistan is also situated here. This is proposed by the Pakistan Muslim League (Q)'s Government.
