= Ikhlas, Pindigheb =

Ikhlas
- Village
- Location within Pakistan
- Coordinates: 33°15′50″N 72°17′40″E
- Country: Pakistan
- Province: Punjab
- District: Attock
- Tehsil: Pindigheb
- Time zone: UTC+5 (PST)

Iikhlas is a village in Pindi Gheb Tehsil of Attock District in Punjab Province of Pakistan.
