= Haddowali =

Haddowali ہدووالی
- Townlet
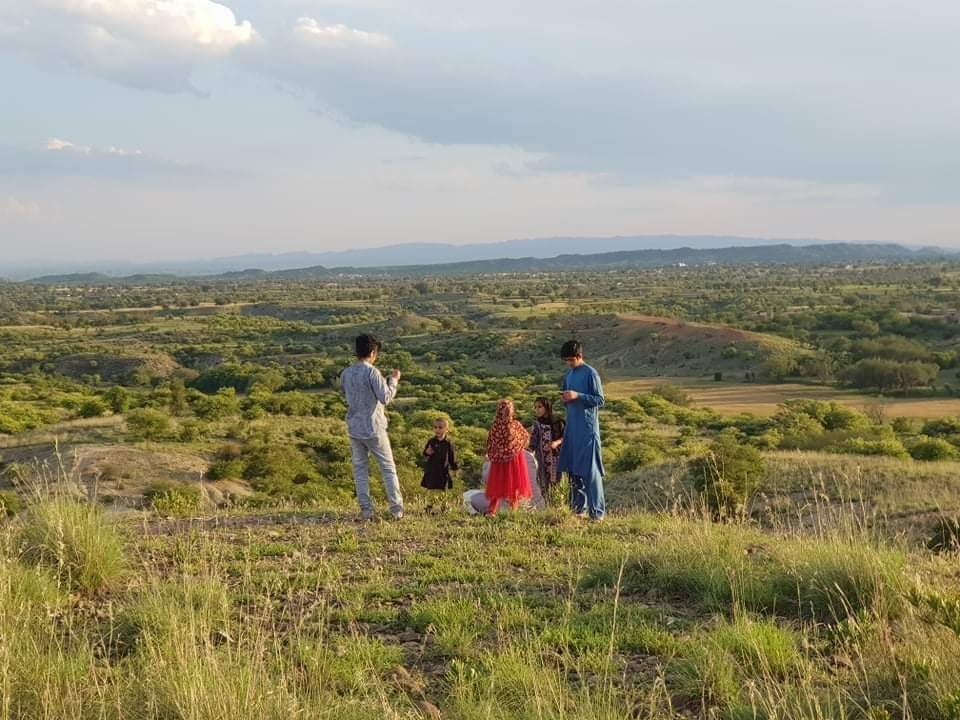

- Location within Pakistan
- Coordinates: 33°41′33″N 72°27′12″E
- Country: Pakistan
- Province: Punjab
- District: Attock
- Tehsil: Jand
- Elevation: 355 m (1,165 ft)
- Time zone: UTC+5 (PST)
- Postal code: 43040

Haddowali (Punjabi and Urdu: ہدووالی) is a village situated in Jand Tehsil of Attock District in Punjab Province, Pakistan.

== Climate ==
Haddowali is situated in Potohar Plateau of Pakistan. In summer the weather gets very hot and in the winter temperature gets very cold.
