= Dhok Mohammad =

Dhok Muhammad
- Village
- Location within Pakistan
- Coordinates: 33°41′33″N 72°27′12″E
- Country: Pakistan
- Province: Punjab
- District: Attock
- Tehsil: Pindi Gheb
- Time zone: UTC+5 (PST)

Dhok Muhammad is a village situated in Pindi Gheb Tehsil of Attock District in Punjab Province of Pakistan. It is 40 km from Pindigheb.

The primary source of income in the hamlet is farming. The culture of the region is generally traditional Punjabi. The local language is Punjabi.
