= Nilhad =

- Village
- Location within Pakistan
- Coordinates: 33°14′28″N 72°16′4″E
- Country: Pakistan
- Province: Punjab
- District: Attock
- Tehsil: Pindi Gheb
- Time zone: UTC+5 (PST)

Nilhad is a village in Pindi Gheb Tehsil of Attock District in Punjab Province of Pakistan.
