= Saghri Khattak =

Saghri (سگھری) is a village and union council of Jand Tehsil, Attock District, Punjab Province, Pakistan located in the southwest of the district. It is located near Jand.

== Saghri ==
Saghri is a village and Union Council in tesil jand district Attock. It is located to the north west side of Tehsil Jand and south west of district Attock. It is a populated village with a minimum 2000 people. There is a high school for boys and girls also.

== History ==
According to what is heard from elders, from about 1200 A.D. Saghri had started living in this area. Saghri had the same traditions as other tribes of Punjab. Their living was always on the move. They kept cattle and grew crops for their living. They came in this area for feeding their cattle because of the River Sindh.
