= Pakka =

Pakka may refer to:

- Pakka (film), a 2018 Indian Tamil-language romantic comedy
- Pacco Qillo, also known as Pakka Fort, an historic fort in Hyderabad, Punjab, Pakistan
- Pakka, a village in Faridkot district, Punjab, India
- Pakka Khanpur Fort, an historic fort in Punjab, Pakistan
- Pakka, or pukka, a structure in Indian vernacular architecture
- Pakka, a fictional character in the TV series Cro
