= Chhab =

Pakistani village

- Union Council
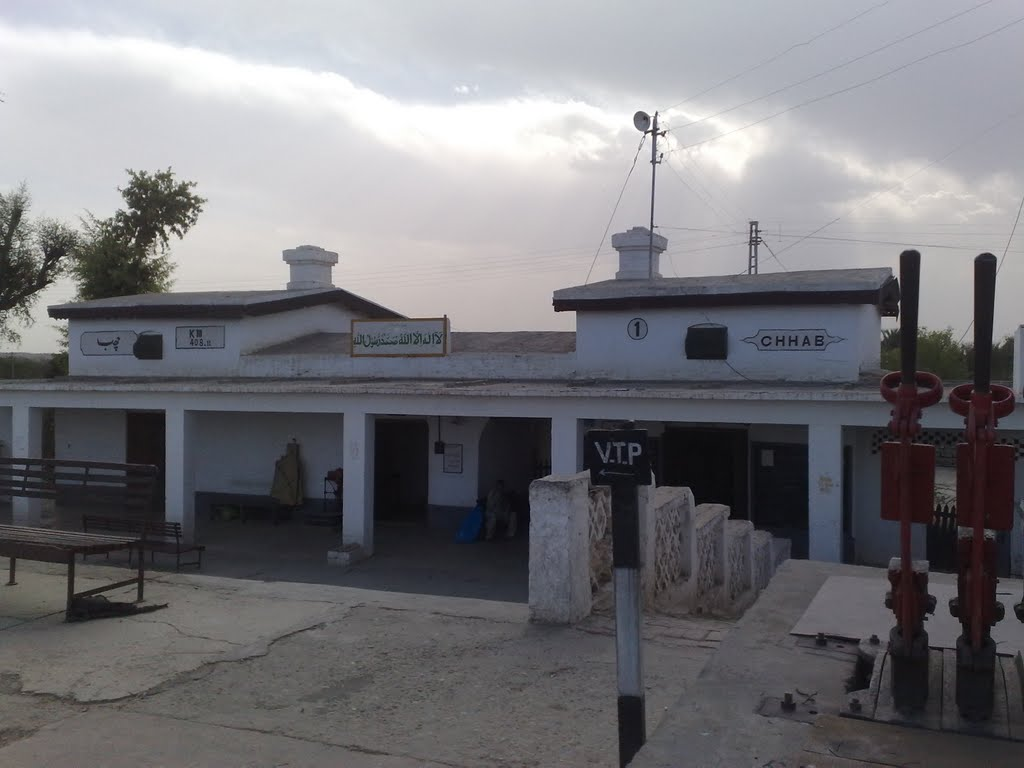
- Chhab Railway Station

- Location within Pakistan
- Coordinates: 33°41′33″N 72°27′12″E
- Country: Pakistan
- Province: Punjab
- District: Attock
- Tehsil: Jand
- Time zone: UTC+5 (PST)

Chhab (Urdu : چھب) is a village situated in Jand Tehsil of Attock District in Punjab Province of Pakistan.

It is located near Makhad Sharif along the bank of the River Indus. Chhab is the headquarters of "Chhab Union Council".
