= Jand, Attock =

Jand
- Location in Pakistan Jand (Punjab, Pakistan)
- Country: Pakistan
- Province: Punjab
- District: Attock District
- Tehsil: Jand Tehsil

Population (2023)
  - Total: 56,254
- Time zone: UTC+5 (PST)
  - Summer (DST): +6

Jand is a town located in the south-western part of Attock District in the Punjab province of Pakistan, 100 km from Islamabad. It lies on the border of Punjab with Khyber Pakhtunkhwa. The Indus river is about 5 km from Jand city. It is surrounded by Pari, Dundi Jiswaal, Marri, Jalwaal, Saghri and Kundrala.

The town is the headquarters of Jand Tehsil, the administrative subdivision, of the district. It lies to the south of the district capital Attock.

Jand is located on the eastern (left) bank of the Indus River and is known for its fertile agricultural land with more than 70,000 population.

== Demographics ==
Population

Historical population
Year	Pop.	±%
1998	17,284	—
2017	48,194	+178.8%
2023	56,254	+16.7%

According to the 2023 census, Jand had a population of 56,254, up from 48,194 in 2017 and 17,284 in 1998.
