= Western Alignment =

Western Alignment of the China Pakistan Economic Corridor
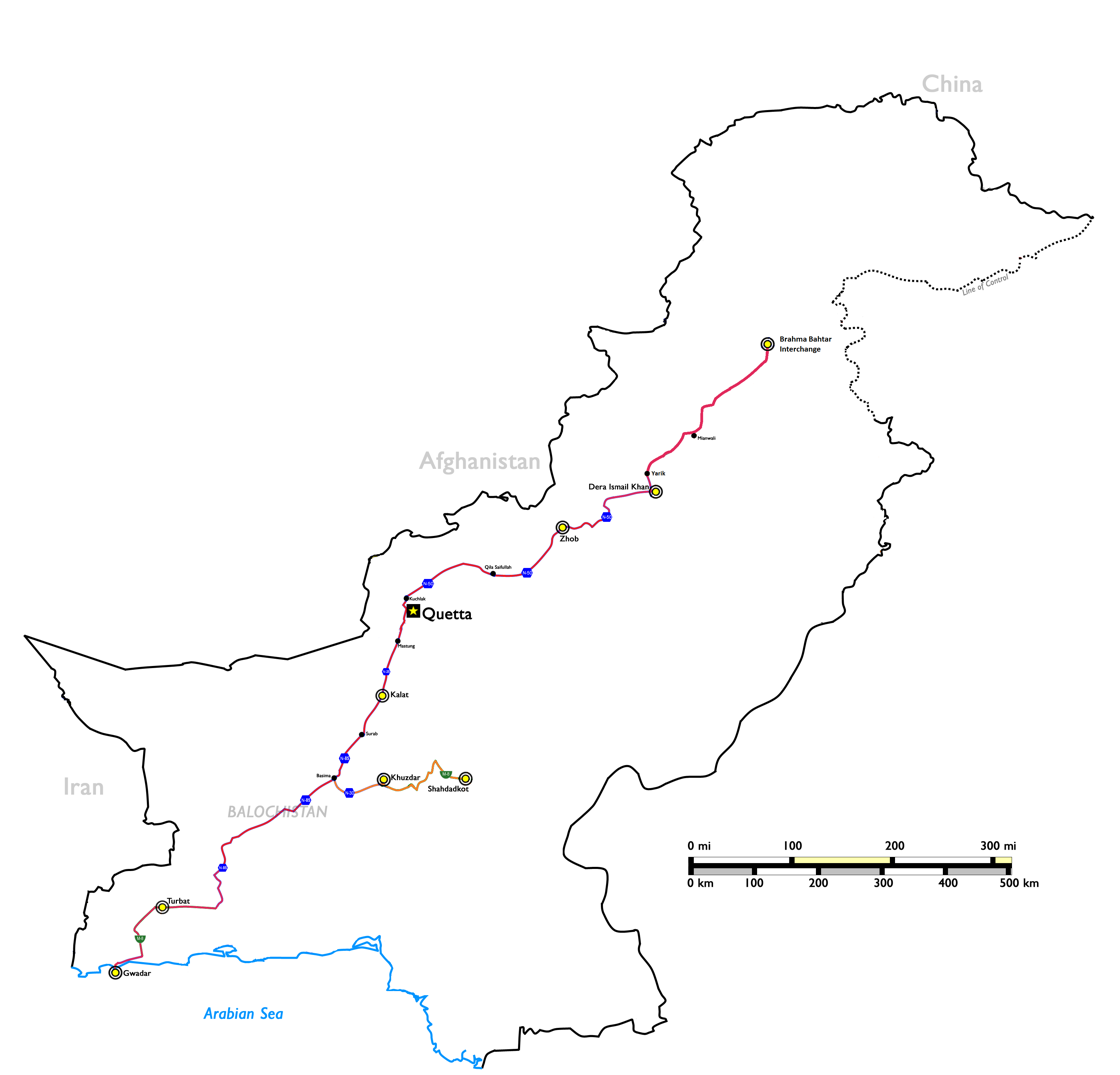
- The Western Alignment of the China Pakistan Economic Corridor is depicted by the red line.

Route information
- Length: 1,153 km (716 mi)

Major junctions
- North end: Brahma Bahtar Interchange near Hasan Abdal, Punjab province
- South end: Gwadar Port

Location
- Country: Pakistan

Highway system
- Roads in Pakistan

The Western Alignment refers to the portions of the China–Pakistan Economic Corridor (CPEC) which are located in the Pakistani provinces of northwestern Punjab, Khyber Pakhtunkhwa and Balochistan.

The CPEC project envisages an expanded and upgraded road network in the aforementioned provinces, and will result in the upgrading or construction of 1,153 kilometres (716 mi) worth of road into two- and four-lane divided highways by mid-2018 along the Western Alignment, with land acquisition sufficient for upgrading parts of the road to a six-lane motorway in the future.

== Route description ==
=== M-14 Motorway ===
The Western Alignment roadway network begins at the Brahma Bahtar Interchange on the M1 Motorway near the towns of Burhan and Hasan Abdal in northern Punjab province. The newly reconstructed Karakoram Highway connects to the Western Alignment at Burhan, near where the new 285-mile-long (285 mi) controlled-access Brahma Bahtar-Yarik Motorway will commence. The motorway terminates near the town of Yarik, just north of Dera Ismail Khan. The route traverses the Sindh Sagar Doab region, and crosses the Indus River at Mianwali before entering into Khyber Pakhtunkhwa province. It consists of 11 interchanges, 74 culverts, and three major bridges spanning the Indus, Soan, and Kurram rivers. It reserved rights-of-way flanking either side of the motorway to allow for widening of the road to a six-lane motorway in the future. Total costs for the project are expected to be $1.05 billion. Pakistan's executive committee of the National Economic Council approved construction of this section of roadway in April 2016, while groundbreaking took place in May 2016. Construction is expected to be completed within 36 months.

The four-lane motorway was completed by 2022 and currently operational as part of Western Alignment of CPEC.The Hakla-DI Khan Motorway connects Northern Areas with the Southern end of Khyber-Pakhtunkhwa and Northern Balochistan.

Western Alignment of CPEC continues further South by connecting Hakla-DI Khan Motorway with the N50 National Highway.

=== Upgrades to National Highway 50 ===
At the southern terminus of the new Burhan–Yarik motorway, the N50 National Highway will also be upgraded between Dera Ismail Khan in Khyber Pakhtunkhwa and Zhob in neighbouring Balochistan province, with eventual reconstruction between Zhob and Quetta. The upgraded roadway will consist of a four-lane dual-carriageway spanning the 205-kilometre (127 mi) distance between the two cities. The first portion of the N50 to be upgraded will be the 81-kilometre (50 mi) portion of the N50 between Zhob and Mughal Kot, with construction works having begun in January 2016. Construction on this portion is expected to be completed by 2018 at a cost of $86 million, While the project is considered a vital link in the CPEC's Western Alignment, the project's cost will not be financed by Chinese state-owned banks, but will instead be financed by the Asian Development Bank under a 2014 agreement which preceded CPEC, as well as by a grant provided by the United Kingdom's Department for International Development.

=== Upgrades to National Highway 25 ===
Heading south from Quetta, the Western Alignment of the CPEC will continue to the town of Surab in central Balochistan as the N25 National Highway. From Surab, a 470-kilometre-long (290 mi) route known as the N85 National Highway will connect central Balochistan with the town of Hoshab in southwestern Balochistan province near the city of Turbat. This portion of roadway between Surab and Hoshab is 51% complete as of January 2016, and is expected to be completed in December 2016.

=== Construction of the M8 motorway ===
The towns of Hoshab and Gwadar are connected by a newly built 193-kilometre-long (120 mi) portion of the M8 Motorway—the Hoshab to Gwadar portion of the motorway was completed and inaugurated in February 2016 by Prime Minister Nawaz Sharif at a cost of approximately $124 million

== Special economic zones ==
The Western Alignment will be flanked by special economic zones along its route, with at least seven special economic zones planned to be established in Khyber Pakhtunkhwa.

== Construction ==
In total, the CPEC project envisages re-construction of 870 kilometres (540 mi) of road in Balochistan province alone as part of the Western Alignment. Of those 870 kilometres (540 mi) of road, 620 kilometres (390 mi) have already been rebuilt as of January 2016.

Pakistan's executive committee of the National Economic Council approved construction of the Brahma Bahtar-Yarik Motorway in April 2016, and construction is expected to be completed within 36 months.

== Financing ==
As part of the CPEC project, the Western Alignment is part of a package of approximately $11 billion worth of infrastructure projects throughout the country that are being developed by the Pakistani government. These projects will be financed by concessionary loans, with composite interest rates of 1.6%, after Pakistan successfully lobbied the Chinese government to reduce interest rates from an initial 3%. The loans are subsidised by the government of China, and are to be dispersed by the Exim Bank of China and the China Development Bank. For comparison, loans for previous Pakistani infrastructure projects financed by the World Bank carried an interest rate between 5% and 8.5%, while interest rates on market loans approach 12%.

== See also ==
- Eastern Alignment
