= Paswal Sharif =

Village in Punjab

- Village
- Location within Pakistan
- Coordinates: 33.51°N 72.87°E
- Country: Pakistan
- Province: Punjab (Pakistan)
- District: Rawalpindi
- Elevation: 513 m (1,683 ft)
- Time zone: UTC+5 (PST)

Paswal Sharif is a village of Rawalpindi District in the Punjab province of Pakistan near Lahore Islamabad Motorway. It is located at 33.5148° N, 72.8722° E with an altitude of 513 metres in Fateh jang Tehsil and lies south of the district capital, Rawalpindi near New Islamabad International Airport.

== Telecommunication ==
The PTCL provides the main network of landline telephone. Many ISPs and all major mobile phone, Wireless companies operating in Pakistan provide service in Paswal Sharif.

== Languages ==
Punjabi is the main language of Paswal Sharif, other languages are Urdu Pothohari, and rarely spoken language Pashto.
