= Haji Shah =

- Town
- Location within Pakistan
- Coordinates: 33°45′N 72°24′E
- Country: Pakistan
- Province: Punjab
- District: Attock
- Tehsil: Attock

Population (2017)
  - Total: 16,506
- Time zone: UTC+5 (PST)

Haji Shah (Urdu: حاجی شاہ ) is a town located at north-west of Pakistan in Attock District of Punjab Province. It is located between Peshawar and Islamabad.

== Geography ==
Haji Shah is located 50 km (appx. 30 miles) north west of Islamabad. It is a valley, surrounded by hills in all directions. Haji Shah is located in an area suitable for growing every sort of crops, especially fruits, but now it is one of the most advanced and developed places in Attock.
