= Ratwal =

Village in Punjab, Pakistan

- Village
- Location within Pakistan
- Coordinates: 33.49°N 72.72°E
- Country: Pakistan
- Province: Punjab (Pakistan)
- District: Attock
- Elevation: 531 m (1,742 ft)
- Time zone: UTC+5 (PST)
- Calling code: 57

Ratwal is a village of Attock District in the Punjab province of Pakistan. It is located at 33.4944° N, 72.7201° E on an altitude of 531 metres.
