= Kot Sundki =

- Village
- Location within Pakistan
- Coordinates: 33°45′N 72°39′E
- Country: Pakistan
- Province: Punjab
- District: Attock
- Tehsil: Fateh Jang
- Time zone: UTC+5 (PST)

Kot Sundki is a village situated in the Attock District of Punjab Province in Pakistan. The Islamabad-Peshawar motorway is about 7 km away from village of Kot Sundki.

It is 15 km far away from Pakistan Ordnance Factories and Wah Cantonment, and 20 km from Hassan Abdal.
