= Tarap =

Tarap may refer to:

- Tarap, Attock, a village and Union Council in the Attock District of Punjab province in Pakistan
- Artocarpus odoratissimus or tarap, a tree in the mulberry and fig family Moraceae
- Tarap (film), a 2006 Pakistani Urdu film
- Tarap (TV series), a 2020 Pakistani TV series

== See also ==
- Tadap (disambiguation)
