= Boota =

- Village
- Location within Pakistan
- Coordinates: 33°41′51″N 72°24′52″E
- Country: Pakistan
- Province: Punjab
- District: Attock

Population (2017)
  - Total: 8,040
- Time zone: UTC+5 (PST)

Boota is a village of Attock District in the Punjab Province of Pakistan.

It is located at an altitude of 351 metres (1154 feet). It is located at the foot of Kala Chitta Range. It is scenic and beautiful, especially in Spring season. Its distance from Attock is about 11km.
