= Tadap =

Tadap may refer to:

- Tadap (1982 film), a 1982 Indian Hindi-language film directed by Jyoti Sarup
- Tadap (1990 film), a 1990 Indian Hindi-language film starring Chunky Pandey
- Tadap (2021 film), an Indian Hindi-language romantic action film by Milan Luthria, starring Ahan Shetty and Tara Sutaria

== See also ==
- Tarap (disambiguation)
