= Indus Golf Club =

Golf course in Attock, Pakistan

Coordinates: 33.7597°N 72.3719°E

The Indus Golf Club is a golf course in Attock, Pakistan. It has 9 holes. It is the only golf course in Attock to entertain citizens of Attock. It is maintained by Pakistan Army's Artillery Centre Attock.
