= Formulli =

- Village
- Location within Pakistan
- Coordinates: 33°56′N 72°25′E
- Country: Pakistan
- Province: Punjab
- District: Attock
- Tehsil: Hazro
- Region: Chhachh
- Time zone: UTC+5 (PST)
- Website: roshanformuli.com

Formulli is a village in the Chach Valley of Attock District, within the Punjab province of Pakistan. It is situated near the Indus River, close to the border of the Khyber Pakhtunkhwa province.
