= Bathou =

- Village
- Location within Pakistan
- Coordinates: 33°41′51″N 72°24′52″E
- Country: Pakistan
- Province: Punjab
- District: Attock
- Time zone: UTC+5 (PST)

Bathou also spelt as Bathu is a village of Attock District in the Punjab Province of Pakistan. It is located at an altitude of 366 metres (1204 feet).
