= Sarai Pakka, Khanpur =

Ruined fort in Pakistan

Pakka Khanpur Fort

General information
- Location: Gujar Khan Tehsil, Punjab, Pakistan
- Coordinates: 33°18′35″N 73°20′31″E
- Year(s) built: 1537–1538

Sarai Pakka, also known as Sarai Pakka Fort, is a ruined caravanserai situated in Gujar Khan Tehsil, Punjab, Pakistan.

== History ==
Sarai Pakka was built under the rule of Sher Shah Suri between 1537 and 1538.

Due to its strategic position, the fort facilitated surveillance of the passages leading to the Kashmir Valley. It is prominently mentioned in Tuzk-e-Jahangiri, a revered record of Mughal Emperor Jahangir's reign. Jahangir is reported to have visited the fort due to its strategic location.

The fort also appears in Hari Ram Gupta's historical account of the Sikhs in December 1796, referenced during Zaman Shah Durrani's march to Lahore from Sarai Pakka Khanpur.

== See also ==
- Begum Ki Sarai
- Akbari Sarai
- Rawat Sarai
