= Ghazi-Barotha Hydropower Project =

Dam near Attock in Pakistan

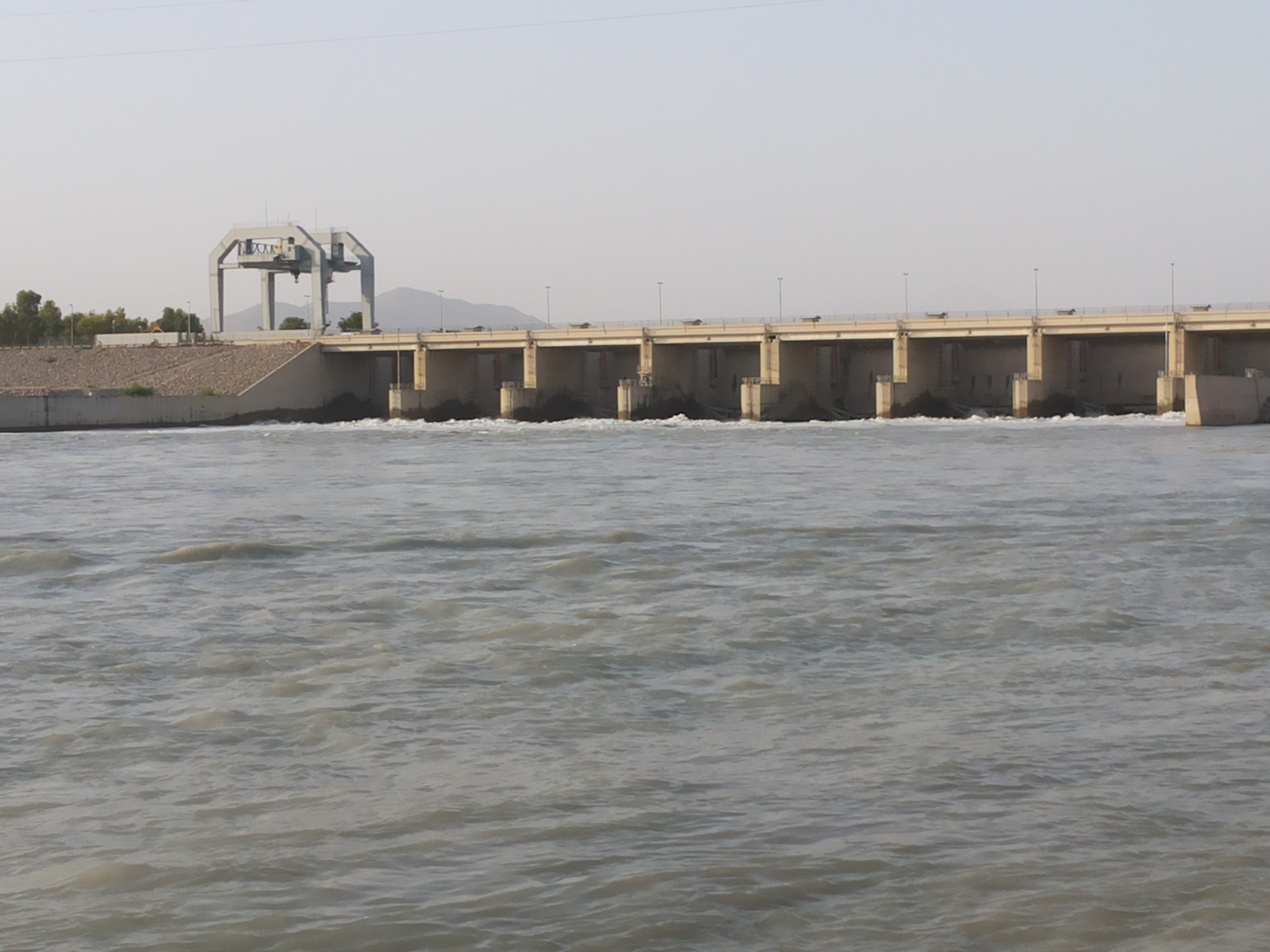
- The Ghazi-Barotha Dam
- Interactive map of Ghazi-Barotha Hydropower Project
- Official name: غازى بروتھا
- Country: Pakistan
- Location: Between Attock, Punjab and Haripur, KP
- Coordinates: 33°46′48″N 72°15′35″E
- Construction began: 1999
- Opening date: 2002
- Construction cost: US$ 2.1 billion
- Owner: WAPDA

Dam and spillways
- Impounds: Indus River
- Height: 50
- Spillway capacity: 18,700 m^{3}/s (660,000 cu ft/s)

Reservoir
- Active capacity: 25,500,000 m^{3} (20,700 acre⋅ft)

Power Station
- Commission date: 2003–2004
- Type: Run-of-the-river
- Hydraulic head: 69 m (226 ft)
- Turbines: 5 × 290 MW Francis-type
- Installed capacity: 1,450 MW
- Annual generation: 7,037 GWh

Ghazi-Barotha Hydropower Project (Urdu: غازى بروتھا) is a 1,450 MW run-of-the-river hydropower project on the Indus River in Pakistan. It is located about 10 km (6.2 mi) west of Attock in the Punjab province. Construction of the project began in 1995. It consists of five generators, each possessing a maximum power generation capacity of 290 MW. The plant was inaugurated on 19 August 2003, by the then President General Pervez Musharraf. It also saw the commissioning of the first two of the five generators i.e. Unit 1 and Unit 2. The last generator was commissioned on 6 April 2004, and the project was completed by December the same year. It costed US$2.1 billion with funding from Pakistan's Water and Power Development Authority (WAPDA), the World Bank, Asian Development Bank, Japan Bank for International Cooperation, Kreditanstalt für Wiederaufbau, European Investment Bank and Islamic Development Bank.

About 1,600 cubic meter per second of water is diverted from the Indus River near the town of Ghazi, Khyber Pakhtunkhwa, about 7 km downstream of Tarbela Dam (4,888 MW). It then runs through a 100 metre wide and 9 metre deep open power channel which is entirely concrete along its 52 km length down to the village of Barotha where the power complex is located. From Ghazi to Barotha, the Indus River inclines by 76 meters over a distance of 63 km. After passing through the powerhouse, the water is returned to the Indus. In addition to these main works, transmission lines for the project stretch 225 km.

The World Bank classed the project "A" for adequate attention to environmental and social issues. The feasibility report was prepared in 1993 during the first tenure of Benazir Bhutto's administration and the Government of Pakistan entered into an agreement for the financing and construction of the project on 7 March 1996.

== Main Features ==
=== Overview ===
About 1,600 cubic meter per second of water is diverted from the Indus River near the town of Ghazi, Khyber Pakhtunkhwa about 7 km downstream of Tarbela Dam (4,888 MW). It then runs through a 100 metre wide and 9 metre deep open power channel down to the village of Barotha where the power complex is located. In the reach from Ghazi to Barotha, the Indus River inclines by 76 meters over a distance of 63 km. After passing through the powerhouse, the water is returned to the Indus. In addition to these main works, transmission lines stretch 225 km.

=== Construction Costs ===
It costed $2.25 billion with the biggest contribution, US$1.1 billion, coming from Pakistan's own Water and Power Development Authority (WAPDA). Other contributors were the World Bank, who gave loan of $350 million, Asian Development Bank, who gave loan of $300 million, Japan Bank of International Cooperation offering of $350 million, Islamic Development Bank, KFW Germany's loan of $150 million and European Investment Bank raised a total sum of US$1.1 billion for the project. The construction of a 225 km, 500kV transmission line, a new 500/22kV substation, and the extension of two further substations was partially funded ($30 million) by the Kuwait Fund for Arab Economic Development in late 1998.

=== Construction Partners ===
A number of countries worked on the project The power house and civil works were constructed by China's Dongfang Electric Corporation; a 51.90 km power channel that took water from the river and then returned it after running it through a battery of Francis turbines was constructed by Italy; turbines came from Germany; and Japan supplied Toshiba generators. 5 steel reinforced penstocks each measuring 10.6m in diameter were supplied by Austrian VA Tech Voest.

=== Barrage ===
The Barrage located 7 km downstream of Tarbela Dam, provides a pond which re-regulates the daily discharge from Tarbela by diverting the flow into the Power Channel, adding compensation water during the low flow seasons. The principal features include 20 No. standard bays, 8 No. under sluices and 8 No. head regulator bays in addition to rim embankments, fuse plug and dividing island. The Barrage can pass the design flood of 18,700 cumecs, equivalent to the flood of record. The fuse plug has been provided to pass the extreme flood up to the capacity of Tarbela's spillway and tunnels equalling 46,200 cumecs.

=== Power Channel ===
The channel is 51.90 km long with a concrete lining and design flow of up to 1600 cumecs at a water depth of 9m. It has a bottom width of 58.4m. The Power Channel has a nearly contour alignment with hills on the left side and the land naturally draining towards the Indus River on the right side.

=== Turbines and Generators ===
The station has an assembly of five 290 MW Francis turbines. To operate the power station, water from the Indus is directed to the turbines via a 52 km-long canal and five pressure pipelines, each measuring 10.6m in diameter. The head of water at the power station is 69 m. The flow rate through each turbine at rated power is 485 m^{3}/s, with each turbine runner having a diameter of 6.5m. The five units have an outer diameter of 10.6m, a total weight of 9,300 tonnes.

=== Comparison to Tarbela ===
The primary purpose of the project was to provide constant peak power at times when Tarbela's generation is low. The sole purpose of Tarbela Dam is to provide water for irrigation; at times when the irrigation water demand is low, water flow and power generation are also low. It is also possible to have no power generation from Tarbela. During the months of May and June, there is reduced generation of power from Tarbela and Mangla Dam as a result of low reservoir levels. This project will provide power peaking capacity throughout the year with full power generation.

=== Environmental aspects ===
The project has negligible impact on existing groundwater table or quality of water due to complete length of the power channel being concrete-based. Adding to the benefits, the power channel under drainage system also helped alleviate existing water-logging problems in this part of the region. Dislocation and resettlement problems are also very small, only 110 dwellings had to be relocated to 3 villages constructed by WAPDA nearby. It is the most cost-effective power facility in Pakistan at this time and remains valid in retrospect due to the extremely favourable power generation costs in comparison with thermal power stations.

== See also ==
- List of hydroelectric power stations
- List of power stations in Pakistan
