= Thatta, Attock =

Thatta
- Location in Pakistan
- Coordinates: 33°34′45″N 72°13′20″E
- Country: Pakistan
- Province: Punjab
- District: Attock District
- Tehsil: Thatta Teysil
- Elevation: 1,335 ft (407 m)
- Time zone: UTC+5 (PST)
  - Summer (DST): +6

Thatta is a small town and Union Council of Attock District in the Punjab province of Pakistan. The Khattar family of this village was of historical importance.
