= Fateh Jang =

Fateh Jang فتح جنگ Fatehjang, Fatehjung
- City
- Location within Punjab, Pakistan Location within Pakistan
- Coordinates: 33°33′59″N 72°38′32″E
- Country: Pakistan
- Province: Punjab
- District: Attock
- Tehsil: Fateh Jang Tehsil

Government
  - Type: Municipal Committee
  - Chairman: Vacant
  - Chief Officer: Khan Badshah

Population (2023 Census)
  - City: 81,321
  - Rank: 156th in Pakistan
- Time zone: UTC+5 (PST)
- Postal code: 43350
- Website: Fateh Jang City

Fateh Jang (Punjabi and Urdu: فتح جنگ) is a city in Attock District of Punjab Province, Pakistan. It is located 40 km (25 mi) from Attock City, and nearly 40 kilometres (25 miles) southwest of Islamabad, Pakistan's capital near M1 motorway.

== Overview ==
The city is located in between Kala Chitta Range and Khairi Murat Range. The New Islamabad International Airport, the largest airport of Pakistan, is located near the city. Fatehjang railway station is one of the important railway stations in the Attock district. It is about 50 km away from Jund City, which is the last tehsil of Attock District in Punjab after which the KPK Province starts.

== History, toponymy and geography ==
According to local tradition, its current name is attributed to an elder of the modern settlers here who fought many wars and always won. There is still a mosque of old times in the Purana Mahallah of the city. Its architecture suggests that the mosque is one thousand years old and may have been built during Ghaznavid rule. This mosque is one of the archeological sites that have been protected under the country's law. During the Sikh period, the regional feudal lords remained the local rulers and paid tribute to the Sikh government. Fateh Jang came under British rule in 1848 after the region was conquered by the British Empire. Fateh Jang became a tehsil of Rawalpindi during British rule. Then in 1940, Attock District was formed and Fateh Jang was included in it. At that time, 203 villages were included in the tehsil Fateh Jang and it consisted of 1393 square kilometers. In 1891, the population of the tehsil was 113041 people. In February 1910, Fateh Jang was declared as notified area, while in January 1924, it got the status of a "small town Committee". Later it got the status of a town committee and then a municipality. Today, the tehsil Fateh Jang consists of 14 union councils.

North of Fateh Jang city, there is some plain area of Kala Chatta mountains, the green valley of Khairi Murat in the south, while between these two mountain ranges, there is a narrow plain in the east and an open plain in the west.

== Demography ==
Population

Historical population
Year	Pop.	±%
1972	10,662	—
1981	13,505	+26.7%
1998	25,986	+92.4%
2017	66,500	+155.9%
2023	81,321	+22.3%

According to the 2023 Census of Pakistan, the population of Fatehjang reached 81,321, up from 66,500 recorded in the 2017 Census. The city registered an annual population growth rate of 3.4% between 2017 and 2023. The 2023 demographic structure reflects a gender distribution of 41,020 males (50.4%) and 40,290 females (49.5%).

== Education ==
There are male and female degree colleges, commerce colleges, vocational institutes, several public and private schools in the city.

=== Notable educational institutes ===
- Government High School No.1 for Boys (Estd. 1927)
- Government Degree College for Boys (Estd. 1976)
- Government Degree College for Women (Estd. 1983)
- Neoken Public School (Estd. 1989)
- Cadet College Fateh Jang (Estd. 2001)

== Notable places ==
- Indar Kot Masjid, the oldest mosque in the city
- Moorat village, an ancient place where archaeological discoveries dating before the Common Era have been made
- Kot Fateh Khan, a state considered area during the Sikh and British times
- Fateh Jang Railway Station, established in 1881
- New Islamabad International Airport, established in 2018
- Tanaza Dam, located in the footsteps of the mountain Kheri Moorat
