= Attock Cantonment =

Army cantonment in Punjab, Pakistan

Attock Cantonment (Urdu: اٹک اردوگاه) is a cantonment adjacent to the city of Attock (known as Campbellpore 1849–1979) in Punjab province, Pakistan.

The Attock Cantonment was established by the British as a military base in 1858 under the name of Campbellpore Cantonment, and later underwent further development as a British military outpost. The cantonment today features numerous community services and landmarks such as schools, colleges, shopping malls, hospitals, residential areas, as well as a specialized Center for the Pakistan Army.
