= Gali Jagir =

Village in Punjab

- Village
- Location within Pakistan
- Coordinates: 33.43°N 72.62°E
- Country: Pakistan
- Province: Punjab (Pakistan)
- District: Attock
- Elevation: 512 m (1,680 ft)
- Time zone: UTC+5 (PST)
- Calling code: 57

Gali Jagir is a village of Attock District in the Punjab province of Pakistan. It is located at 33.4312° N, 72.6299° E on an altitude of 512 metres.
