= Tarap, Attock =

Pakistani village

Tarap is a village and Union Council in the Attock District of Punjab province in Pakistan. Tarap is situated on the bank of Soan River. It is administered by Jand Tehsil and Attock District.
