= Begum Ki Sarai =

Caravanserai in Pakistan

Begum ki Sarai
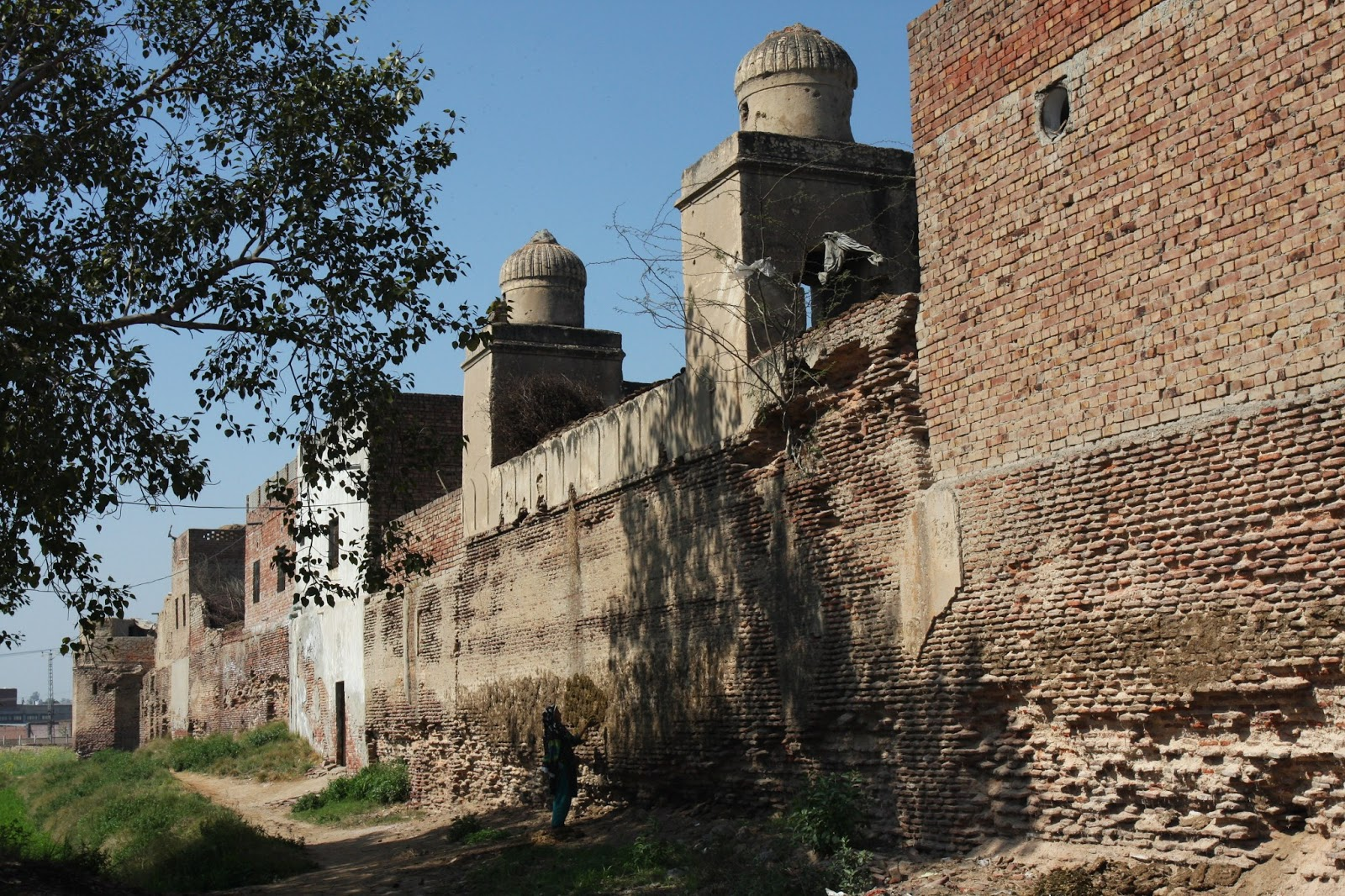
- Interactive map of Begum ki Sarai
- Location: Attock District, Punjab, Pakistan
- Type: Gateway
- Completion date: 16th century

Begum ki Sarai is a caravanserai, located near Attock Fort across the Attock Bridge in Punjab, Pakistan. It was built in the early 16th century during the Mughal period. The caravanserai is in a square shape, measuring 112 by 112 yards. Its three bastions have survived. There is a baradari in the centre of the caravanserai. Begum ki Sarai was located on the historic Grand Trunk Road, connecting Agra with Jalalabad. It is one of the series of caravanserais constructed in the 16th and 17th centuries; other notable surviving examples on the Lahore-Peshawar section include Sarai Akbari, Rawat and Gor Khatri. Due to its location near the Attock Fort the Sarai is currently closed to public visitors.
