= Yarik =

Yarik یارِک
- Town and union council
- Location in Khyber Pakhtunkhwa, Pakistan Yarik (Pakistan)
- Coordinates: 32°6′13″N 70°47′28″E
- Country: Pakistan
- Province: Khyber Pakhtunkhwa
- District: Dera Ismail Khan
- Time zone: UTC+5 (PST)

Yarik (Urdu: یارِک) is a town and union council in Dera Ismail Khan District of Khyber-Pakhtunkhwa. It is located on Indus Highway (N-55) and has an altitude of 185 metres (610 feet). It will be the southern terminus of the Brahma Bahtar-Yarik Motorway.
