= Pindigheb =

Pindi Gheb پنڈی گھیب
- City
- Location in Punjab, Pakistan Pindi Gheb (Pakistan)
- Coordinates: 33°14′28″N 72°16′4″E
- Country: Pakistan
- Province: Punjab
- District: Attock
- Tehsil: Pindi Gheb
- Elevation: 310 m (1,020 ft)

Population (2023)
  - City: 63,810
- Time zone: UTC+5 (PST)
  - Summer (DST): UTC+6
- Postal code: 63260
- Area code: 0572
- Website: TMA Pindi Gheb

Pindigheb (or Pindi Gheb) (Urdu, Punjabi: پنڈی گھیب) is a city in Punjab province Pakistan and headquarters of Pindi Gheb Tehsil (an administrative subdivision) of Attock District. M-14 motorway passes through Pindi Gheb.

== History ==
The Imperial Gazetteer of India, compiled over a century ago during British rule, described the town as follows:

Pindi Gheb Town.-Head-quarters of the subdivision and tahsil of the same name in Attock District, Punjab, situated in 33º 14' N. and 72º 16' E., 21 miles from Jand station on the North-Western Railway. Population (1901), 8,452. Formerly known as Pindi Malika-i-Shahryār or Malika-i-Auliya, or 'queen of the saints', it drives its modern name from the Ghebā tribe of Jats, and is now the ancestral home of the Jodhra Maliks, who founded it in the thirteenth century. The municipality was created in 1873. The income and expenditure during the ten years ending 1902-3 averaged Rs. 4,400. In 1903-4 the income was Rs. 5,200, chiefly from octroi; and the expenditure was Rs. 5,800. A vernacular middle school is maintained by the municipality, and a dispensary by Government.

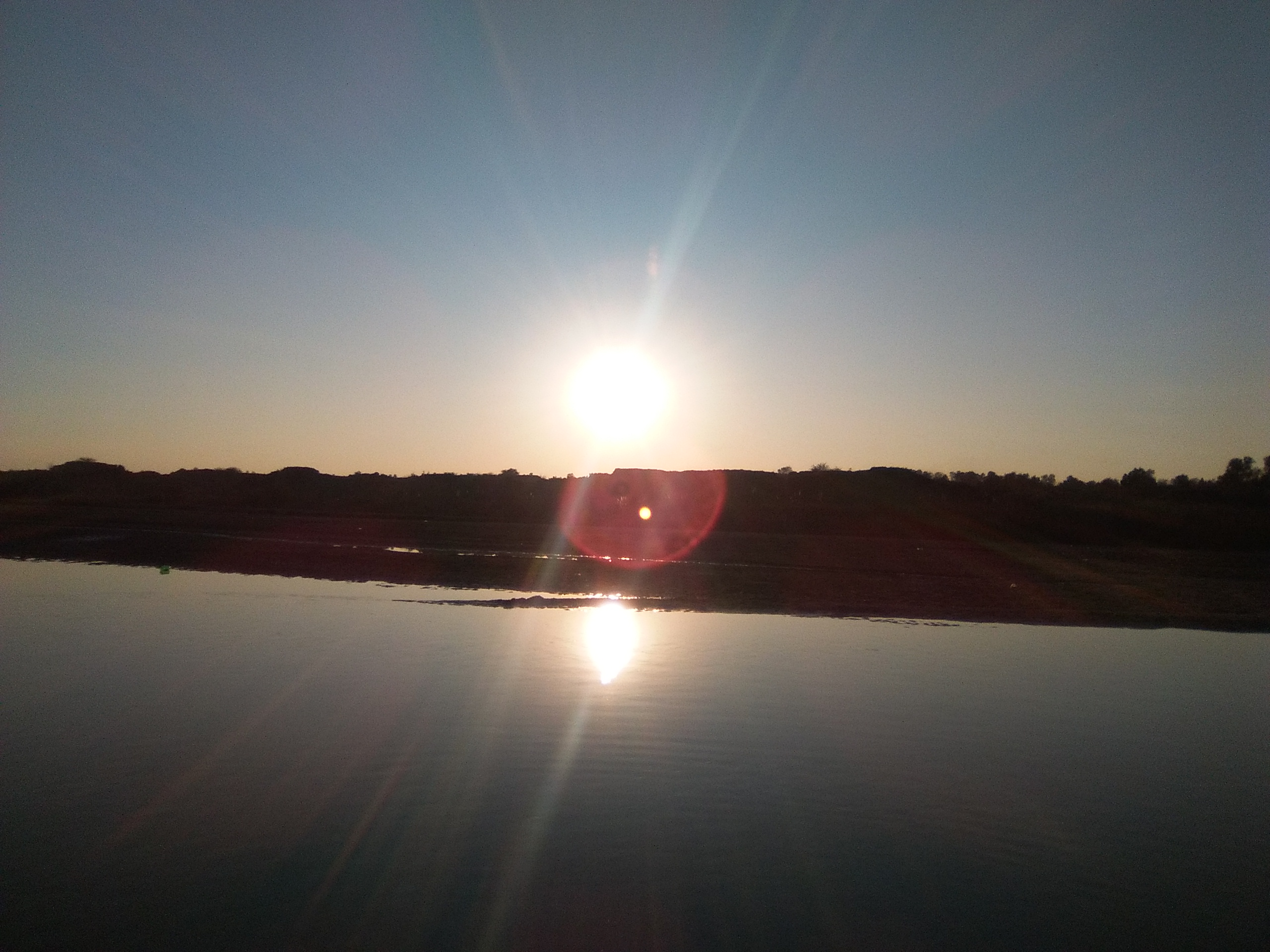
Sunset in Pindi Gheb

In 997 CE, Mahmud Ghaznavi, took over the Ghaznavid dynasty empire established by his father, Sabuktigin, In 1005 he conquered the Shahis in Kabul in 1005, and followed it by the conquests of Punjab region. The Delhi Sultanate and later Mughal Empire ruled the region. The Punjab region became predominantly Muslim due to missionary Sufi saints whose dargahs dot the landscape of Punjab.

After the decline of the Mughal Empire, the Sikh invaded and occupied Attock District. The Muslims faced severe restrictions during the Sikh rule. During the period of British rule, Attock District increased in population and importance.

The predominantly Muslim population supported Muslim League and Pakistan Movement. After the independence of Pakistan in 1947. The name of incumbent Assistant Commissioner of Pindi Gheb sub division is Ijaz Abdul Karim.

== Present Day ==
Pindi Gheb is an important region of trade and acts as an important terminal for the mega highway CPEC. The main economy of Pindi Gheb revolves around agriculture and cattle. The towns local government, however, according to local residents has failed numerous times to provide the town with any real infrastructural or educational developments. The relative population of the town still remains poor with low-grade roads and bridges. Contrary to such statements, some of the richest families in Northern Punjab come from Pindi Gheb, with them owning thousands of acres of lands, huge properties both abroad and in urban centers in Pakistan, heavy presence in the industrial sector and close affiliation with people affiliated with the military and government. However, recently many reforms were passed by the government of Punjab to commence energy and road projects in Attock, including Pindi Gheb. There are many monuments present in Pindi Gheb from the Sikh and British eras which can be visited free of cost. There is also a waterfall nearby known to harbor a rare species of fish. The area is known to be relatively safe as it is included in the zone of "Act for the Super fortification for the North West Districts of Punjab" which is done with the use of Attock fort, known to be located close by. Pindi Gheb can today be visited by the CPEC, or 8 local roads that lead towards the city through other paths inside of Attock.

== Demographics ==
=== Population ===
Census	Population
1972	17,982
1981	20,535
1998	29,850
2017	45,195
2023	63,810

== Bibliography ==
- Shackle, Christopher (1980). "Hindko in Kohat and Peshawar". Bulletin of the School of Oriental and African Studies. 43 (3): 482–510. doi:10.1017/S0041977X00137401. ISSN 0041-977X.
- Gazetteer of Attock 1934
