= Attock Fort =

Fort in Punjab, Pakistan

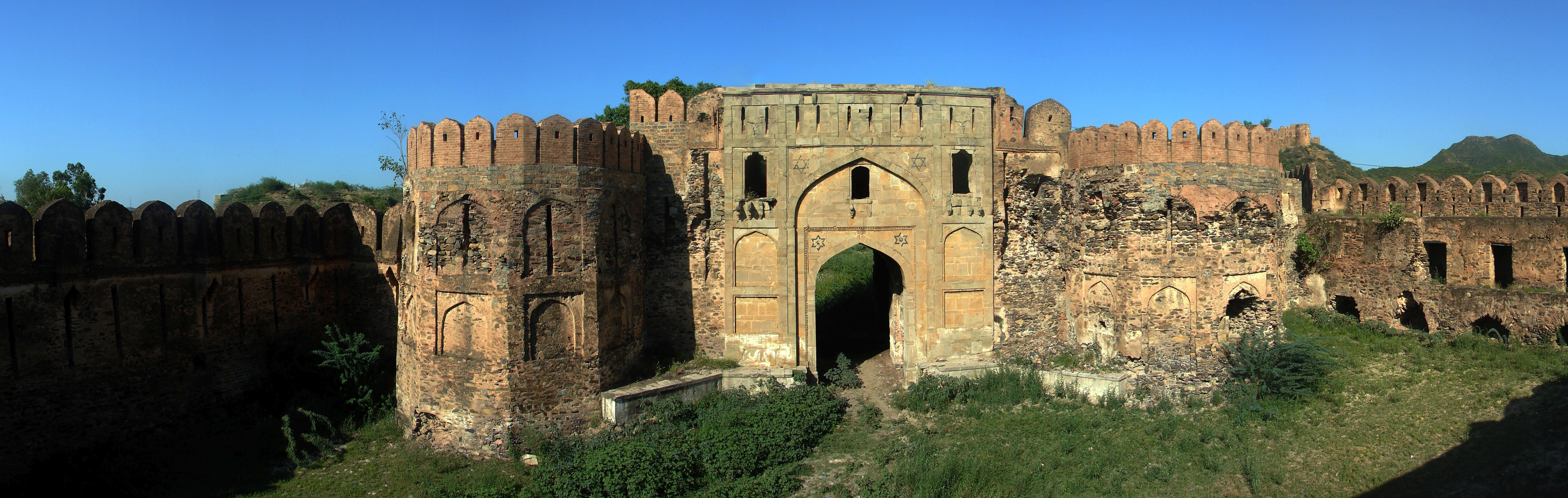
- Interactive map of Attock Fort
- 33°53′31″N 72°14′13″E
- Location: Attock, Punjab, Pakistan

History
- Built: 1583

Site notes
- Owner: Mughal Empire (1583–1707); Maratha Empire (1707–1764); Durrani Empire (1764–1813); Sikh Empire (1813–1849); East India Company (1849–1858); British Raj (1858–1947); Pakistan (1947–present)
- Website: www.attockonians.com

Attock Fort (Urdu, Punjabi: قلعہ اٹک) is a 16th-century fortress in Punjab, Pakistan. It was built at Attock Khurd during the reign of Akbar from 1581 to 1583 under the supervision of Khawaja Shamsuddin to protect the passage of the Indus River.

== Location ==
It is sandwiched between Peshawar Road on one side and the Indus on the other. It is located at a distance of 80 km from the capital city of Islamabad. As it is a military base, visitors are not allowed inside the fort.

== History ==
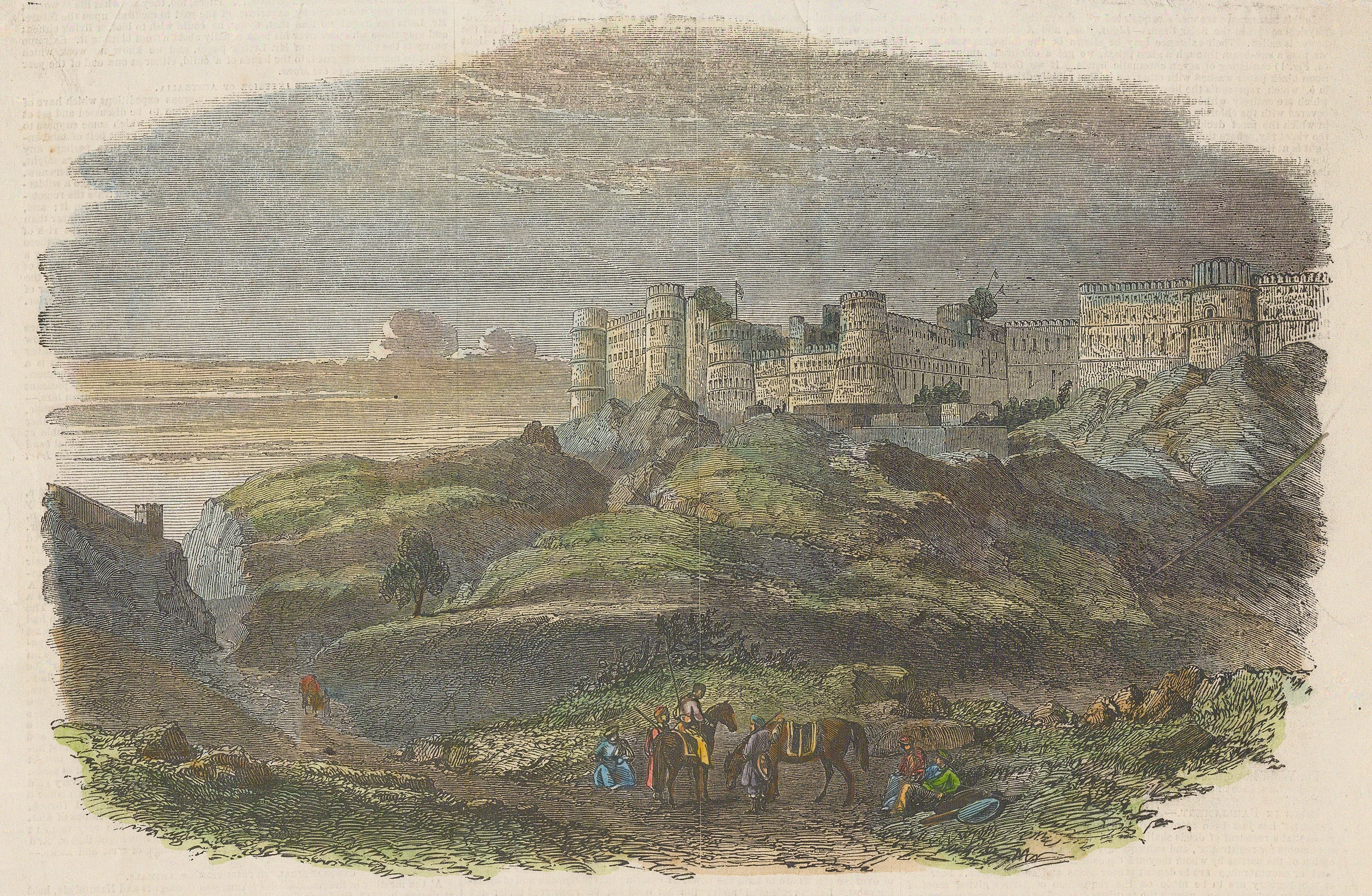
Engraved wood print of the fort in the Illustrated London News, 1896

The fort was constructed in 1581 on the orders of the Mughal emperor Akbar. Construction was completed in two years after which the fort was used as a key defense line against the Afghan invaders. The fort was captured in 1758 by the Marathas under Tukojirao Holkar and Sabaji Shinde Sidhojiraje. Ahmad Shah, the Durrani ruler, captured Attock and halted the Maratha advance in the north after the battle of Panipat in 1761. It was later conquered from the Afghans by the Sikh Empire under Mohkam Chand following the battle of Attock in 1813. In the 1830s, the Sikhs strengthened the fort by constructing 'very high and massy bastions' at each gate. The British took over the fort following the annexation of Punjab in 1849. After the partition of British India, it came under control of Pakistan Army. It became headquarters of the 7th Division of Pakistan Army. In 1956, the fort was handed over to the Special Services Group (SSG), a special operations force of the Pak Army. Today the fort remains in control of the SSG.

== Architecture ==
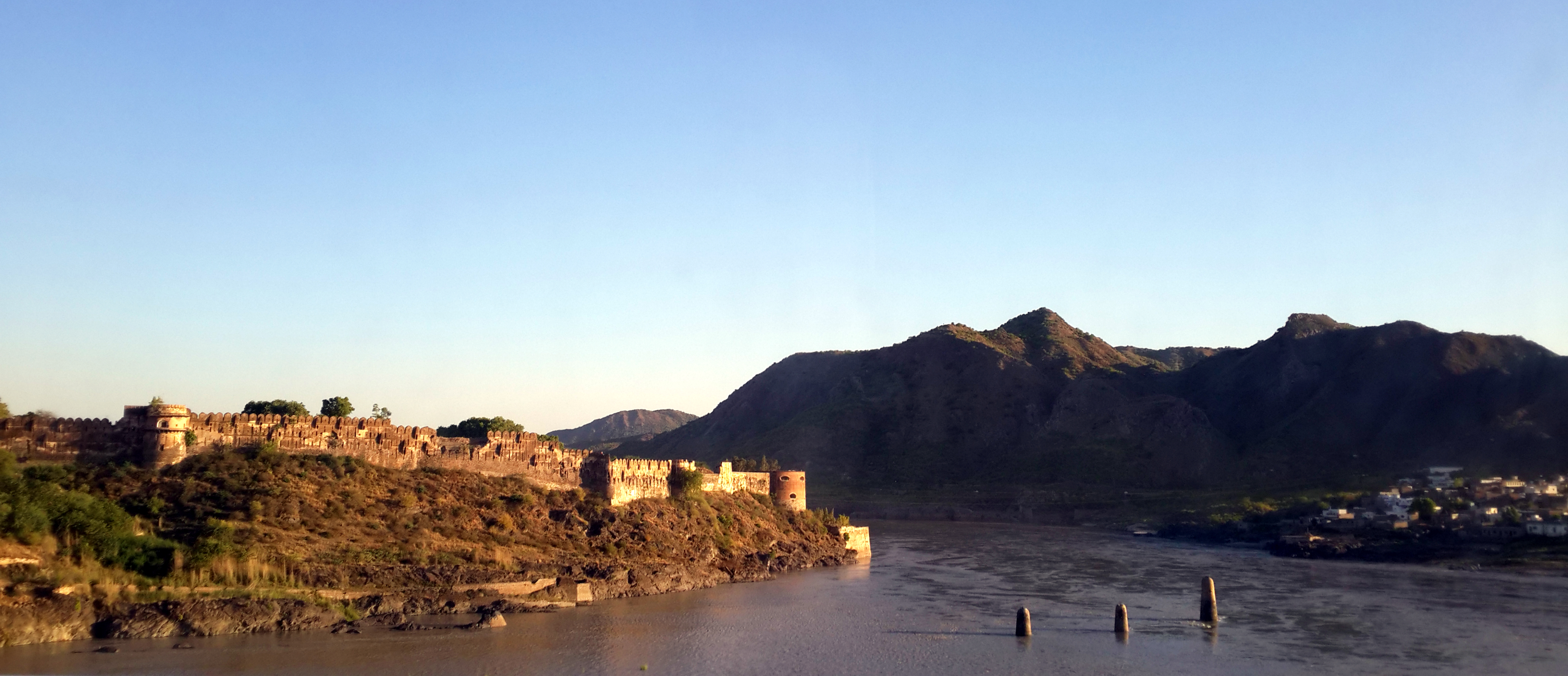
Overlooking the river

The fort consists of 6 gates and the perimeter of its walls is 1600 metres. The gates are named the Delhi Gate, Lahori Gate, Kabuli Gate, Aabi (water) Gate, Mallahitola Gate and Mori Gate. The fort has 8 bastions, all circular except one which is rectangular. The fort is divided into an upper part for soldiers and a lower part, for common people. There is also a hammam (bathhouse) near the Delhi gate. Indus River runs along northwestern walls of the fort. Begum Ki Sarai, a Mughal era caravanserai, is located just besides the fort.

== See also ==
- List of UNESCO World Heritage Sites in Pakistan
- List of forts in Pakistan
- List of museums in Pakistan
