= Attock Tehsil =

Tehsil subdivision in Punjab, Pakistan

- Tehsil
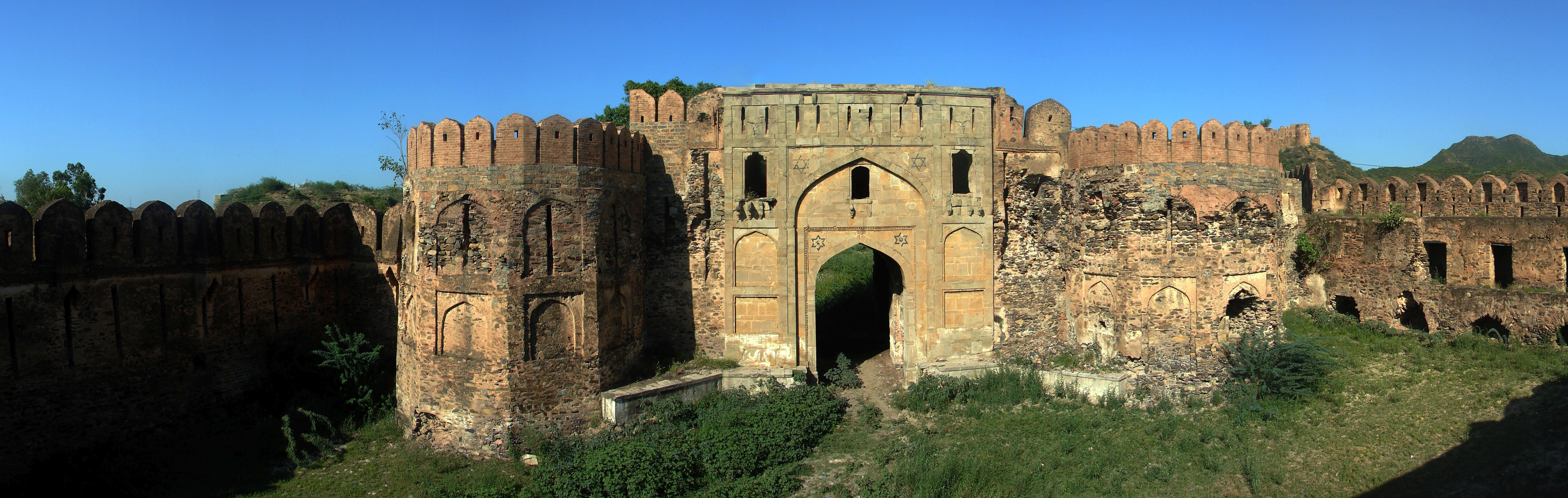
- View of Attock Fort

- Location within Punjab, Pakistan Location within Pakistan
- Coordinates: 33°46′0″N 72°22′0″E
- Country: Pakistan
- Province: Punjab
- District: Attock

Population (2017 Census of Pakistan)
  - Total: 434,705
- Time zone: UTC+5 (PST)

Attock Tehsil (Punjabi and Urdu: تحصیل اٹک) is one of the six tehsils of Attock District in the Punjab Province of Pakistan.

The Indus River bounds it on the north-west, dividing it from the Khyber Pakhtunkhwa, while the Haro River flows through from east to west.

The north-west corner is occupied by the fertile Chach Valley. South of this lies a dry sandy plain, beyond which rises the Kala Chitta Range. The eastern half consists of the tract known as the Nala, which includes, along with a number of low hills and much broken country, a considerable area of fairly good level land, portions of which are irrigated from wells and by cuts from the Haro and other smaller streams.

== History ==
The district according to the Imperial Gazetteer of India:

"The population in 1901 was 150,550 compared with 141,063 in 1891. It contains the towns of Attock (population, 2,822), Hazro (9,799), the cantonment of Campbellpur (5,036) and 191 villages. The land revenue and cesses amounted in 1903-4 to 9 lakhs. Hasan Abdal, is a place of historical interest.
