= Pindi Gheb Tehsil =

Fifth-tier subdivision in Punjab, Pakistan

Pindi Gheb Tehsil تحصیل پنڈی گھیب
- Tehsil
- Location within Punjab, Pakistan Location within Pakistan
- Coordinates: 33°14′28″N 72°16′4″E
- Country: Pakistan
- Province: Punjab
- District: Attock
- Towns: 1
- Union Councils: 13
- Time zone: UTC+5 (PST)
  - Summer (DST): UTC+5 (PDT)

Pindi Gheb Tehsil (in Punjabi and Urdu: تحصِيل پِنڈى گهيب) is an administrative subdivision (tehsil), of Attock District in the Punjab Province of Pakistan, the capital is the town of Pindi Gheb.

The tehsil is administratively subdivided into 13 Union Councils, two of which form the capital - Pindi Gheb.

== History ==
The Imperial Gazetteer of India, compiled over a century ago during British rule, described the tehsil as follows:

"Pindi Gheb Tahsīl.-Tahsīl of Attock District, Punjab. The Indus River bounds it on the north-west. Its highest point lies in the Kala Chitta Range. The tahsīl is mainly a bleak, dry, undulating and often stony tract, broken by ravines, and -sloping from east to west: a country of rough scenery, sparse population, and scanty rainfall. West along the Indus are the ravines and pebble ridges which surround Makhad. Only near Pindi Gheb town does the broad bed of the Sil river show a bright oasis of cultivation among the dreary uplands which compose the rest of the tahsīl. The population in 1901 was 106,437, compared with 99,350 in 1891. It contains the town of Pindi Gheb (population, 8,452), the headquarters; and 134 villages. The land revenue and cesses in 1903-4 amounted to 1 -9 lakhs."
