= Fateh Jang Tehsil =

Tehsil subdivision in Punjab, Pakistan

Fateh Jang تحصیل فتح جنگ Fatehjang
- Tehsil
- Location in Punjab, Pakistan Fateh Jang (Pakistan)
- Coordinates: 33.5485°N 72.6528°E
- Country: Pakistan
- Province: Punjab
- District: Attock
- Union councils: 14

Area
  - Total: 866 km^{2} (334 sq mi)
- Time zone: UTC+5 (PKT)

Fateh Jang Tehsil (Punjabi and Urdu: تحصیل فتح جنگ) is an administrative subdivision (tehsil), of Attock District in the Punjab province of Pakistan lying between 33°10′ and 33°45′ North, and 72°23′ and 73°1′ East. The tehsil is administratively subdivided into 14 Union Councils.

A notable Kharosthi inscription is located near the main town of Fateh Jang, which is also the headquarters of the tehsil.

== History ==
Until the independence of Pakistan in 1947, Fateh Jang was under British rule, the Imperial Gazetteer of India describes the Tahsil (tehsil) as follows:

"Fatahjang (Fatehjang), easternmost tahsil of Attock District, Punjab, with an area of 866 square miles. The population in 1901 was 114,849, compared with 113,041 in 1891. It contains 204 villages, of which Fatahjang (population, 4,825) is the headquarters. The land revenue and cesses amounted in 1903-4 to 1.9 lakhs. The tahsil is divided into three distinct parts. North of the Kala-Chitta is a small plain much cut up by ravines. South of the Khairi-Murat. (near Dhari village) is the fertile Sohan valley, while between the two ranges of hills lies a rough plain, narrow in the east and broadening towards the west"

.

== Languages ==
Inhabitants of Fateh Jang Tehsil speak Sohain dialect of Punjabi language, the name is derived from Sohan River.
