= Jand Tehsil =

Fifth-tier subdivision in Punjab, Pakistan

Jand Tehsil تحصیل جنڈ
- Tehsil
- Location within Punjab, Pakistan Location within Pakistan
- Coordinates: 33°41′33″N 72°27′12″E
- Country: Pakistan
- Province: Punjab
- District: Attock
- Union Councils: 15

Population
  - Tehsil: 330,328
  - Urban: 56,254
  - Rural: 274,074
- Time zone: UTC+5 (PST)

Jand Tehsil (in Urdu/Punjabi: تحصیل جنڈ ) is a tehsil of Attock District in Punjab Province of Pakistan.

== Administration ==
The tehsil is administratively subdivided into 15 union councils including Jand. The other union councils of the tehsil are:

- Domel
- Mithial
- Basal
- Chhab
- Jaba
- Khunda
- Langar
- Chapri
- Makhad
- Pindsultani
- Saghri
- Dakhnair
- Tarap
- Jalwal
- Thatta

== See also ==
- Goah
