= Kala Chitta Range =

Mountain range in Punjab, Pakistan

Kala Chitta
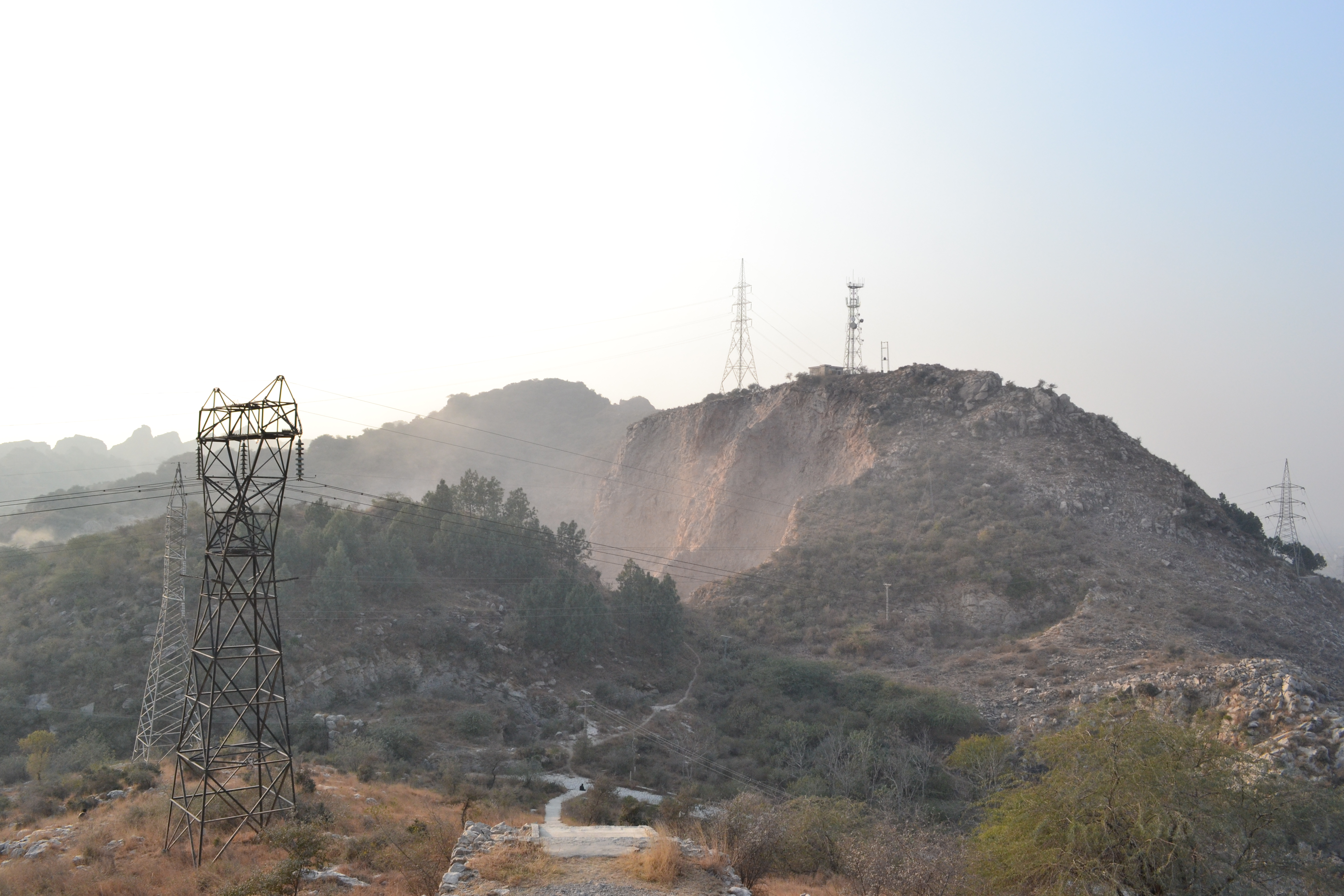

Highest point
- Elevation: 841 m (2,759 ft)
- Coordinates: 33°43′N 72°10′E

Naming
- Native name: کالا چٹا (Punjabi)

Geography
- Location within Pakistan
- Country: Pakistan
- Province: Punjab
- District: Attock

Kala Chitta Range (Urdu, Punjabi: کالا چِٹا) is a mountain range in the Attock District of Punjab, Pakistan. The range thrusts eastward across the Pothohar Plateau towards Rawalpindi.

"Kala" and "Chitta" are Punjabi words, meaning "black" and "white", respectively. The Kuldana Formation in the Kala Chitta Range is best known for its fossil Eocene mammals, including primitive cetaceans such as Pakicetus, Ambulocetus and Attockicetus. Kuldana mammals have been considered in different studies as coming from the early Lutetian (early Middle Eocene), late Ypresian (late early Eocene) or, more recently, encompassing much of Ypresian up to early Lutetian time (early part of the early Eocene to early Eocene medium).

== Geology ==
=== Kuldana Formation ===
The Kuldana Formation is a thin, 20-120 m thick tongue of low-lying continental red beds that lie within a much thicker sequence of foraminifera-rich marine formations. Shallow planktonic and benthic foraminifera limit the age of the Kuldana Formation to the late early or early middle Eocene, and the current interpretation of global sea level stratigraphy favours the latter.

The short duration of the low-water interval when Kuldana mammals were discovered means that differences between samples likely represent differences in local living environments, deposition sites, and sampling, rather than a substantial difference in age.

=== Kohat Formation ===
The Kohat Formation consists of calcareous shale and light grey limestone. It lies on top of the Kuldana Formation and intermingles with the Murree Formation of the Rawalpindi group. It formed in the middle Eocene.
