= Attock District =

Attock District ضلع اٹک
- District of Punjab
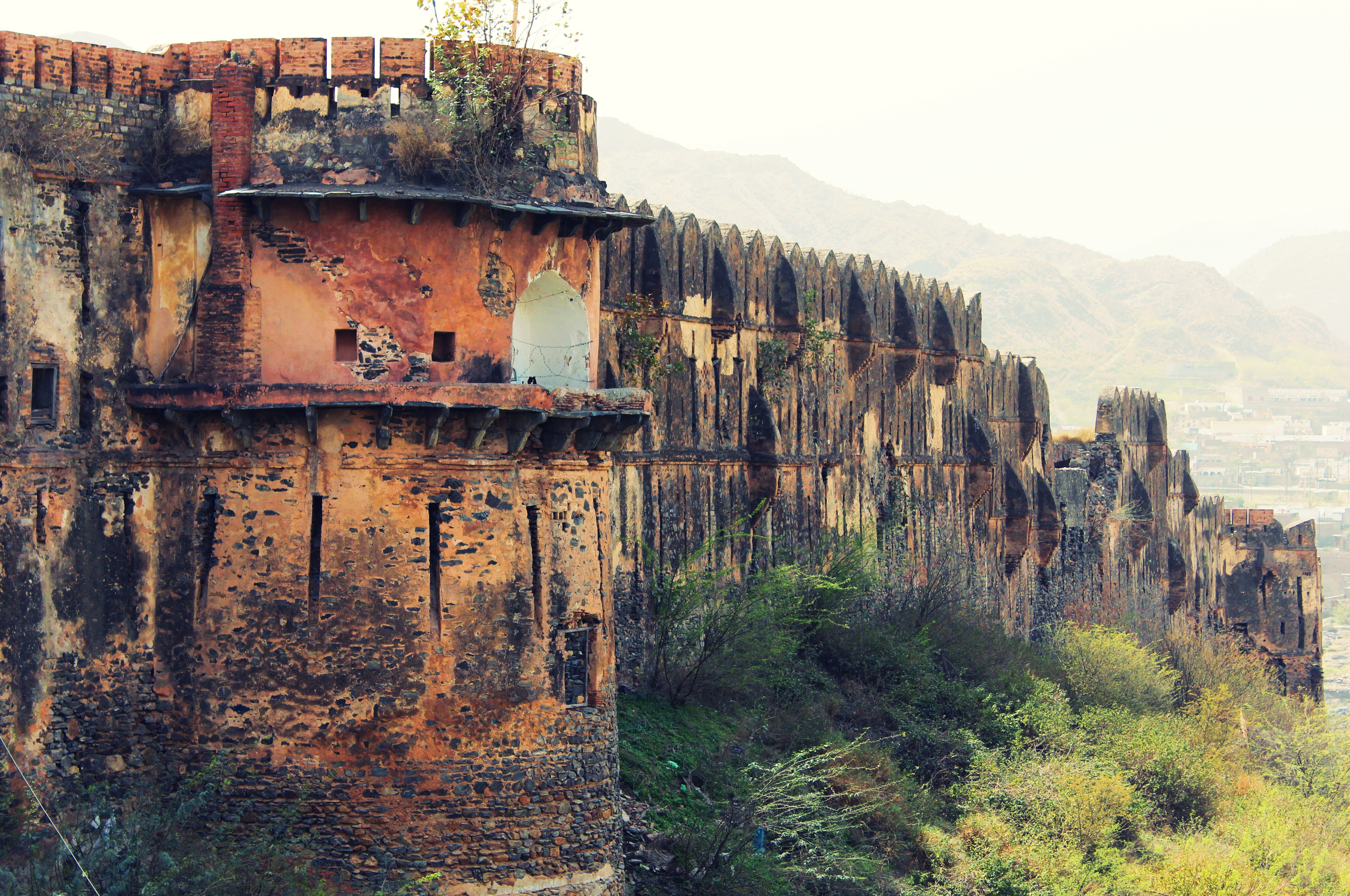
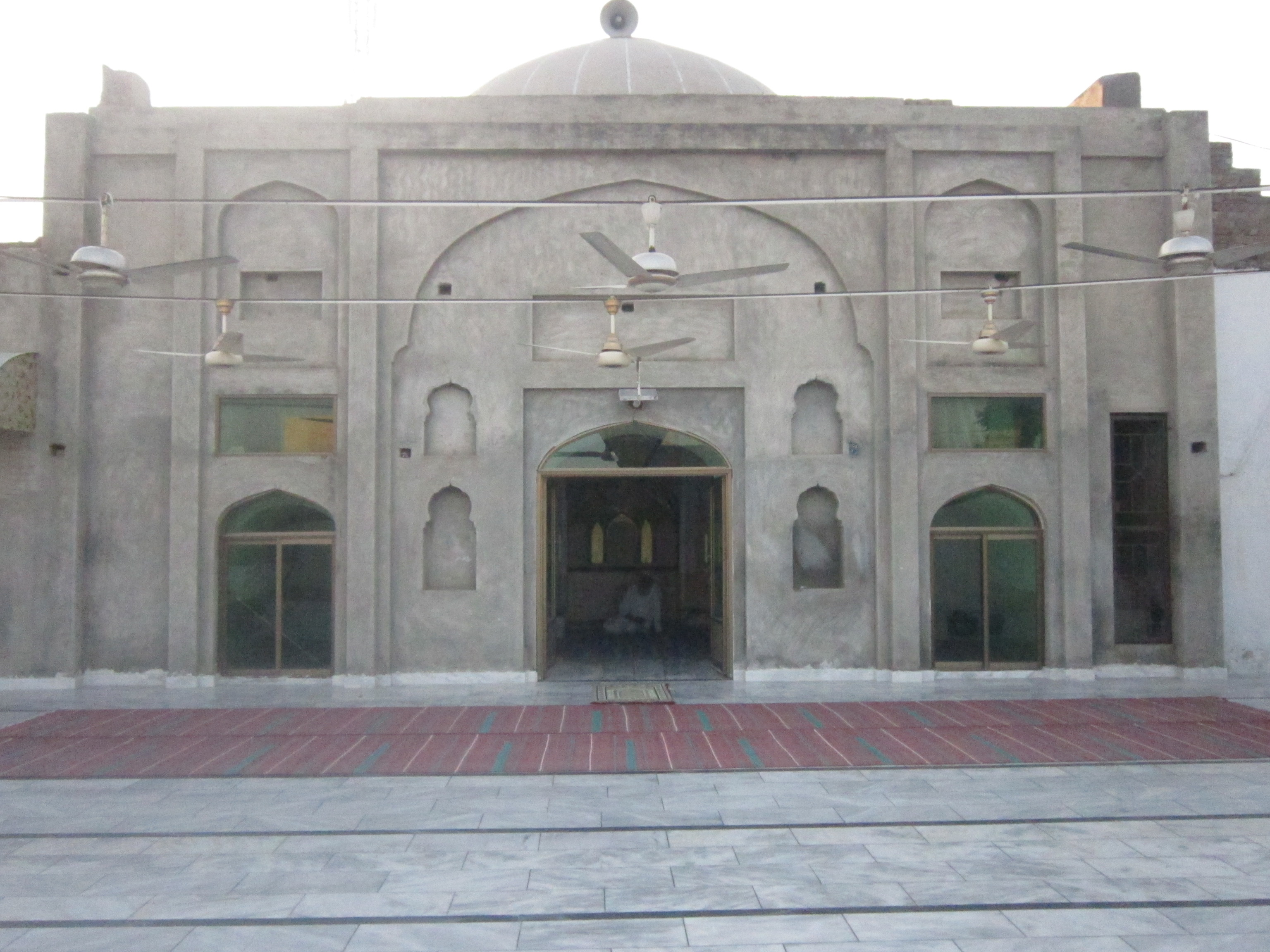
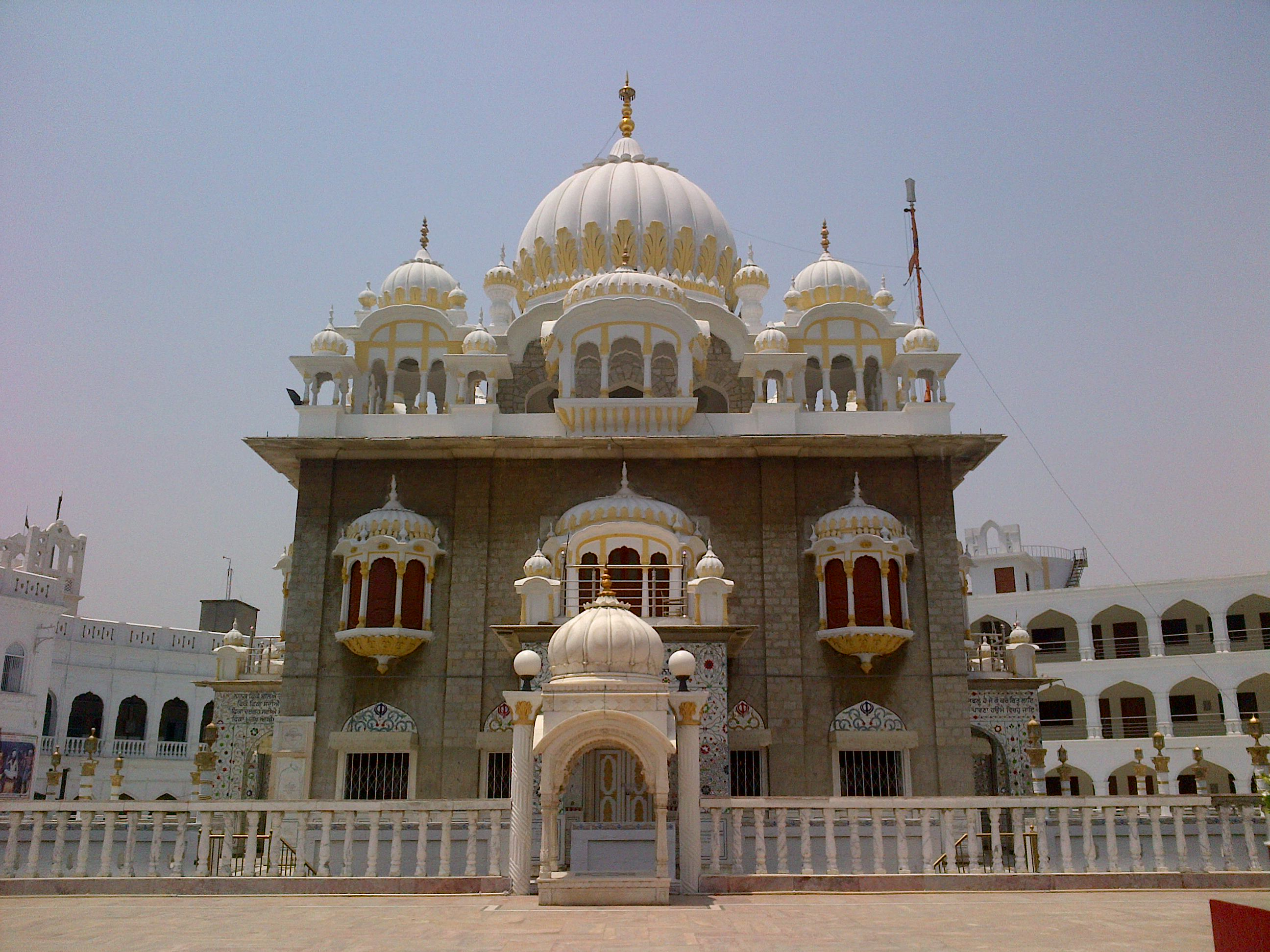
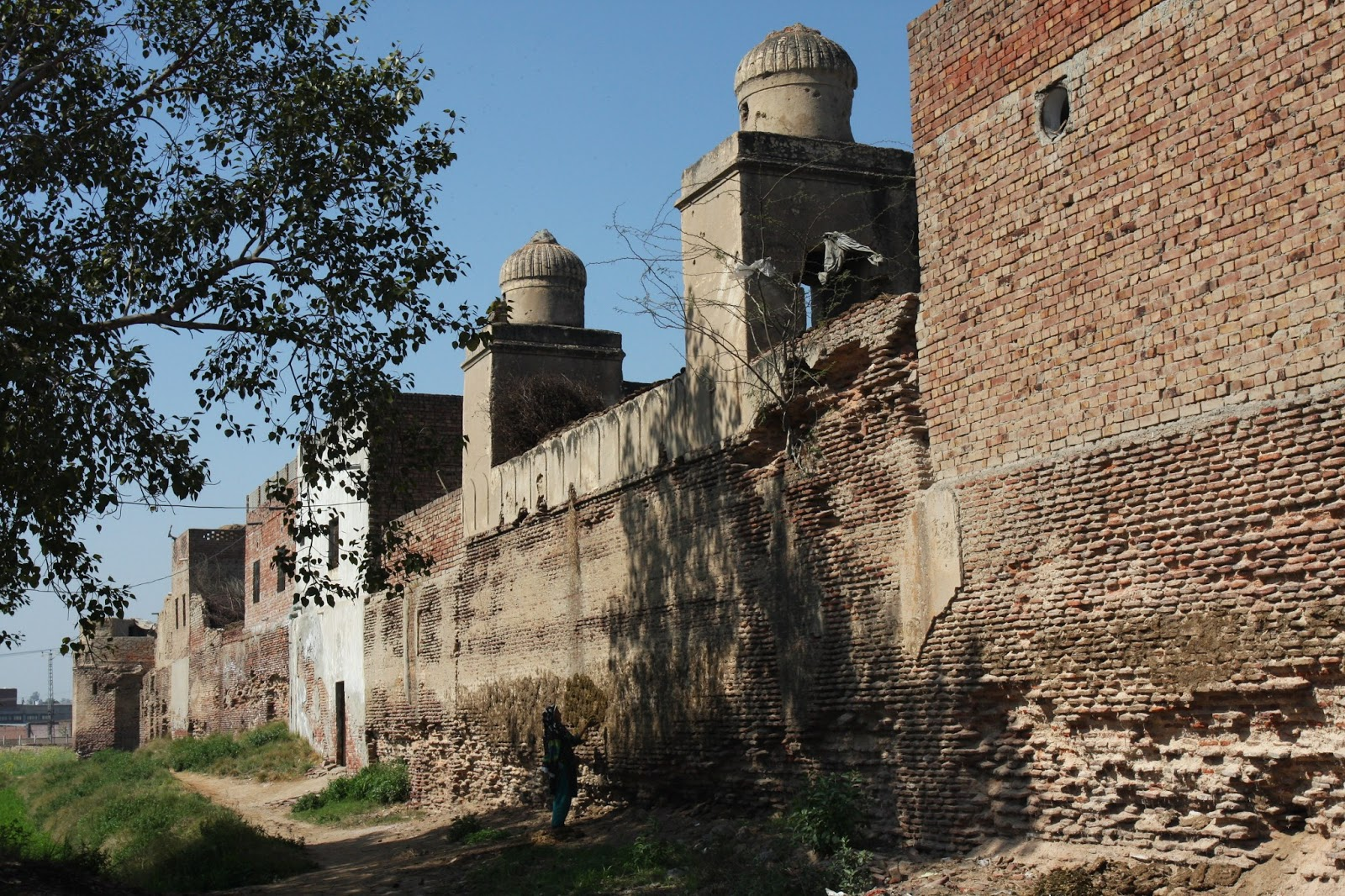
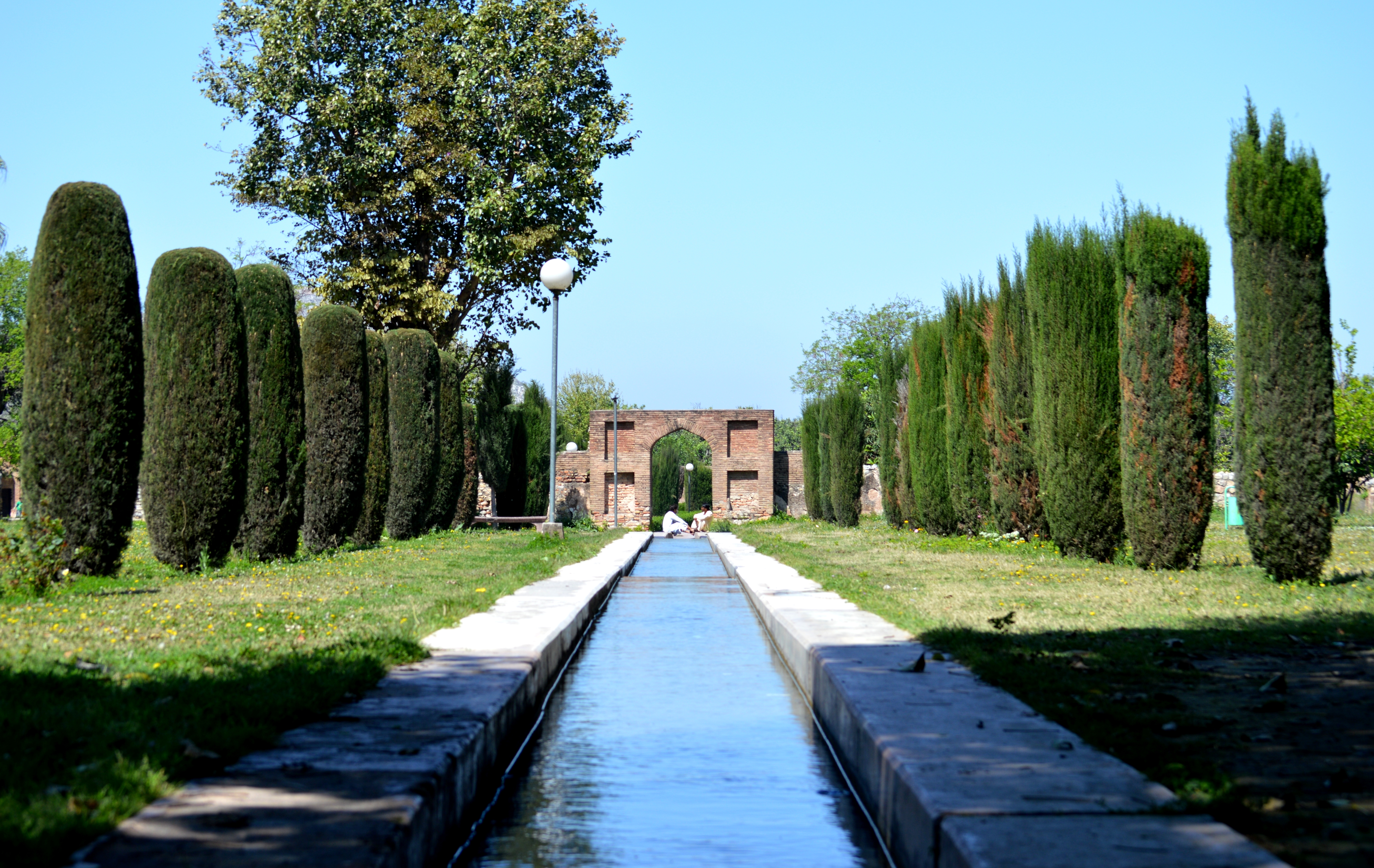
- Clockwise from top-left: Attock Fort, Inderkot Mosque, Begum Ki Sarai, Wah Gardens, Gurdwara Panja Sahib

- Attock District highlighted within Punjab Province
- Coordinates: 33°46′19″N 72°21′41″E
- Country: Pakistan
- Province: Punjab
- Division: Rawalpindi
- Established: April 1904; 122 years ago
- Headquarters: Attock

Government
  - Type: District Administration
  - Deputy Commissioner: Rao Atif Raza

Area
  - District of Punjab: 6,857 km^{2} (2,648 sq mi)
- Elevation: 355 m (1,165 ft)

Population (2023)
  - District of Punjab: 2,133,005
  - Density: 316.5/km^{2} (820/sq mi)
  - Urban: 623,984 (29.25%)
  - Rural: 1,546,439 (70.75%)

Literacy
  - Literacy rate: Total: (70.22%); Male: (79.69%); Female: (60.66%)
- Time zone: UTC+5 (PKT)
- Postal code: 43600
- Area code: 057
- ISO 3166 code: PK-PB
- No. of Tehsils: 6
- Tehsils: Attock Tehsil; Fateh Jang Tehsil; Hazro Tehsil; Hassan Abdal; Jand Tehsil; Pindi Gheb Tehsil
- Website: attock.punjab.gov.pk

Attock District (Punjabi and Urdu: ضلع اٹک, romanized: Zilā' Aṭṭak) is a district within the Rawalpindi Division of Punjab, Pakistan. It is located on the Pothohar Plateau in northern Punjab, and was established in April 1904 as the Campbellpur District, being renamed to its current state in 1978.

According to 2023 census, the population of Attock District is 2,133,005 (2.13 million), making it the 23rd most populous district of the province, behind Rajanpur district and the 37th most populous district in the country.

== Etymology ==
The name 'Attock' is the romanised form of the Punjabi word aṭak, which means blockade, barrier or obstruction. The district was formed as Campbellpur District after Commander-in-Chief of British forces Sir Colin Campbell. Later, in 1978, district name was changed to Attock after the major and historical city of Attock to reflect the older, historical name of the region.

== History ==
=== Pre-historic period ===
The region that is now the Attock District has been historically part of Soanian Culture. Nearby archeological excavations near the Soan Valley in southern Attock and northern Chakwal point to prehistoric human activity. The stone tools and early human remains found from these sites show human activity of at least 500,000 years ago. Several petroglyphs have also been uncovered near the Ghazi-Gariala hydropower project which were a major hurdle in development of the project as it posed environmental threat to an ancient and culturally significant site.

=== Ancient period ===
==== Indus Valley and Gandharas ====
The region has also been influenced by the Indus Valley Civilization as the nearby site of Taxila (now in Rawalpindi district) shows deep connections with Indus valley settlements as the site lied on the old Grand Trunk Road. Later, after the decline of the Indus valley civilization around 1500 BCE, several Indo-Aryan tribes settled in the region most notably of which was the Gandhara civilization which were present in Khyber Pakhtunkhwa, Gilgit-Baltistan, Punjab and Kashmir. The Chhachh region in the north of the district was specifically identified as Chukhsa country of Gandhara in the Taxila copper plate inscription.

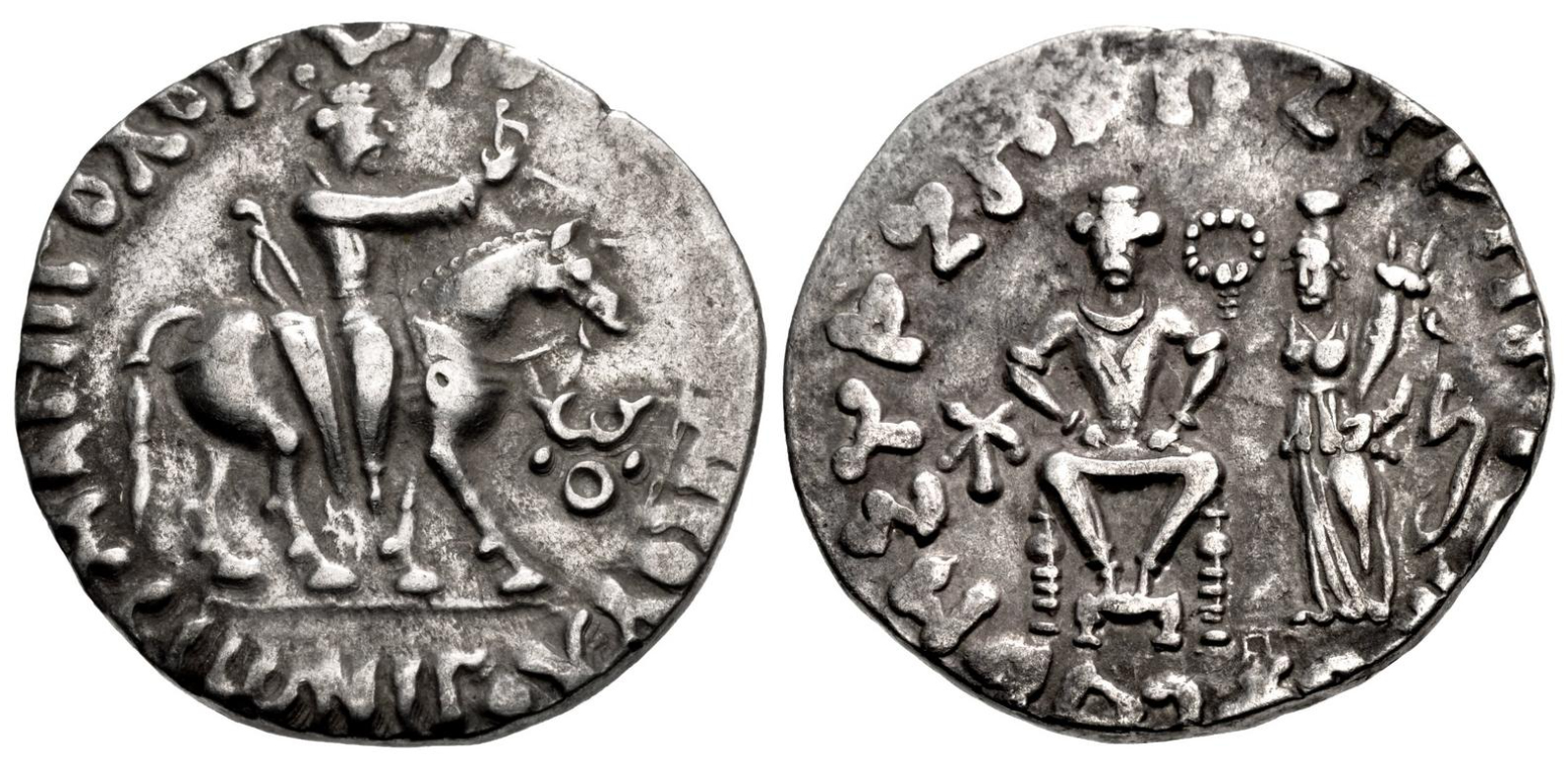
Indo-Scythian Zeionises. Circa 45–35 to 5 BCE. Uncertain mint in Chukhsa (Chach)

==== Achaemenid Empire ====
By the 6th century BCE, the Gandharas were occupied by the Achaemenid Empire. According to Babylonian and Elamite versions of the Behistun inscription, the region is mentioned as the Gandāra district of the Paropamisadae province of the empire and spanned much of Gandhara. Evidence from the Behistun Inscription shows that, firstly, Cyrus the Great in 535 BCE, expanded his empire as far as Gandāra. later Darius I in 518 BCE came back to the region and further secured it. The region remained under the Achaemenid Empire until Alexander the Great's invasion of the sub-continent in 527 BCE.

==== Alexander's invasion of India ====
Before his campaign, Alexander demanded that all chieftains of the former satrapy of Gandāra come to him and submit to his authority. Ambhi (Greek: Omphis), who ruled the region at the time, complied and sent an emissary to Alexander. As a result, Alexander was able to secure control over the region without resistance, even before launching his campaign to India. Alexander not only accepted Ambhi's offers but also returned his title as chieftain of the area between the Indus and Jhelum (Greek: Hydaspes) rivers. However, soon after the death of the Alexander, the region was briefly controlled by his general Eudemus but was conquered by the Maurya Empire ahortly afterward.

=== Modern period ===
The district was established in April 1904 as the Campbellpur District during the British Raj through the merging of tehsils from neighbouring districts. Today the district consists of 6 tehsils: Attock, Fateh Jang, Hazro, Hassan Abdal, Jand and Pindi Gheb.

== Administration ==
The Attock District has its main headquarters at Attock City. The District is further divided into 6 Tehsils, namely, Attock, Fateh Jang, Hasan Abdal, Hazro, Jand and the Pindi Gheb Tehsil. These tehsils are further divided into a total of 72 Union Councils. Jand Tehsil has the most number of union councils at 15, followed by Attock, Hazro and Fateh Jang tehsils all at 14, then by Pindi Gheb tehsil at 13 and lastly by Hasan Abdal at just 9.

=== Union councils ===
==== Attock Tehsil ====
- Haji Shah
- Kamra
- Golra
- Mirza
- Bolianwal
- Akhori
- Sheenbagh
- Sarwala
- Surgsalar
- Dakhnair
- Haroon
- Shinka
- Jalalia
- Ghorghushti

==== Hazro Tehsil ====
- Malak Mala
- Nartopa
- Khagwani
- Musa Cudlathi
- Bahadur Khan
- Shamsabad
- Hameed
- Kamil Pur Musa
- Tajak
- Formulli
- Mullan Mansoor
- Jallo
- Sultan Pur
- Bhalarjogi

==== Hassan Abdal ====
- Pind Mehri
- Pourmina
- Kot Sundki
- Burhan
- Jabbi Kasran
- Dhreak
- Bahtar
- Jhang
- Qutbal

==== Fateh Jang ====
- Jangle
- Dhurnal
- Malal
- Gali Jagir
- Sharai Sadullah
- Ajuwala
- Gulial
- Kot Fateh Khan
- Mianwala
- Dhoke Fateh

Pindigheb tehsil

== Geography ==
Attock district is located in the north western side of the Punjab province. The District has a total area of 6,857 km^{2} (2,648 sq mi), making it the 7th largest district of the province and 41st largest overall in Pakistan. Attock borders 7 district namely Chakwal to the south, Mianwali to the southwest, Rawalpindi to the east, Kohat to the west, Nowshera to the northwest, and Swabi and Haripur to the north.

Geographically, Attock is mainly hills, plateaus, and dissected plains. The Pothohar Plateau mainly covers the eastern part of the district, in the middle of the district sits a low mountain range; Kala Chitta Range whereas on the western and southern side of the district the indus merges with its river tributaries such as Haro river which joins the Indus near Ghazi Barotha Dam, Soan river which joins indus at Makhad and Kabul river which meets Indus river near Attock Khurd. In between the hills and rivers, dissected plains exist.

== Demographics ==
Overview of Demographics of Attock District by Tehsil
Tehsil	Area (km^{2})	Pop. (2023)	Density (ppl/km^{2}) (2023)	Literacy rate (2023)	Union Councils
Attock	1,002	516,277	515.25	74.80%	14
Fateh Jang	1,249	374,726	300.02	66.94%	13
Hassan Abdal	350	253,670	724.77	70.22%	9
Hazro	348	386,544	1,110.76	66.45%	14
Jand	2,043	330,328	161.69	71.59%	11
Pindi Gheb	1,865	308,878	165.62	70.36%	11

=== Population ===
Historical population
Year	Pop.	±% p.a.
1951	486,043	—
1961	532,845	+0.92%
1972	748,890	+3.14%
1981	876,667	+1.77%
1998	1,274,935	+2.23%
2017	1,883,556	+2.08%
2023	2,133,005	+2.09%

As of the 2023 census, Attock district has 353,973 households and a population of 2,170,423. The district has a sex ratio of 100.83 males to 100 females and a literacy rate of 70.22%: 79.69% for males and 60.66% for females. 473,463 (22.2% of the surveyed population) are under 10 years of age. 623,984 (28.75%) live in urban areas.

=== Religion ===
Religion in Attock district (2023)
Religion	Percent
Islam	99.3%
Christianity	0.62%
Other	0.08%

As per the 2023 census Islam is the predominant religion with 99.3% of the population.

Religion in contemporary Attock District
Religious group	1941		2017		2023	
Religious group	Pop.	%	Pop.	%	Pop.	%
Islam	484,616	89.85%	1,877,221	99.51%	2,118,159	99.30%
Hinduism (Note: 1931-1941: Including Ad-Dharmis)	35,593	6.60%	575	0.03%	501	0.02%
Sikhism	16,740	3.10%	—N/a	—N/a	769	0.04%
Christianity	500	0.09%	7,699	0.41%	13,286	0.62%
Others	1,910	0.36%	883	0.05%	290	0.01%
Total Population	539,359	100%	1,886,378	100%	2,133,005	100%
Note: 1941 census data is for Attock, Pindi Gheb and Fateh Jang tehsils of erstwhile Attock district of Punjab province, which roughly corresponds to contemporary Attock district. District and tehsil borders have changed since 1941.

Religious groups in Attock District (British Punjab province era)
Religious group	1911		1921		1931		1941	
Religious group	Pop.	%	Pop.	%	Pop.	%	Pop.	%
Islam	471,890	90.88%	465,694	90.91%	531,793	91.07%	611,128	90.42%
Sikhism	26,914	5.18%	19,809	3.87%	19,522	3.34%	20,120	2.98%
Hinduism	19,741	3.8%	26,184	5.11%	31,932	5.47%	43,209	6.39%
Christianity	707	0.14%	557	0.11%	710	0.12%	504	0.07%
Zoroastrianism	11	0%	0	0%	0	0%	3	0%
Jainism	9	0%	5	0%	2	0%	13	0%
Buddhism	1	0%	0	0%	1	0%	7	0%
Others	0	0%	0	0%	0	0%	891	0.13%
Total population	519,273	100%	512,249	100%	583,960	100%	675,875	100%
Note1: British Punjab province era district borders are not an exact match in the present-day due to various bifurcations to district borders — which since created new districts — throughout the historic Punjab Province region during the post-independence era that have taken into account population increases. Note2: District created in 1904 by taking Talagang Tehsil from Jhelum District and Pindi Gheb, Fateh Jang and Attock Tehsils from Rawalpindi District.

Religion in the Tehsils of Attock District (1921)
Tehsil	Islam		Hinduism		Sikhism		Christianity		Jainism		Others (Note: Including Buddhism, Zoroastrianism, Judaism, Tribals, others, or not stated)		Total	
Tehsil	Pop.	%	Pop.	%	Pop.	%	Pop.	%	Pop.	%	Pop.	%	Pop.	%
Attock Tehsil	158,313	91.26%	11,203	6.46%	3,428	1.98%	523	0.3%	5	0%	0	0%	173,472	100%
Pindigheb Tehsil	108,356	90.22%	6,131	5.11%	5,582	4.65%	28	0.02%	0	0%	0	0%	120,097	100%
Talagong Tehsil	98,887	91.14%	5,233	4.82%	4,379	4.04%	2	0%	0	0%	0	0%	108,501	100%
Fatehjang Tehsil	100,138	90.89%	3,617	3.28%	6,420	5.83%	4	0%	0	0%	0	0%	110,179	100%
Note: British Punjab province era tehsil borders are not an exact match in the present-day due to various bifurcations to tehsil borders — which since created new tehsils — throughout the historic Punjab Province region during the post-independence era that have taken into account population increases.

Religion in the Tehsils of Attock District (1941)
Tehsil	Islam		Hinduism		Sikhism		Christianity		Jainism		Others (Note: Including Anglo-Indian Christians, British Christians, Buddhism, Zoroastrianism, Judaism, Tribals, others, or not stated)		Total	
Tehsil	Pop.	%	Pop.	%	Pop.	%	Pop.	%	Pop.	%	Pop.	%	Pop.	%
Attock Tehsil	207,557	88.6%	19,346	8.26%	6,047	2.58%	455	0.19%	13	0.01%	846	0.36%	234,264	100%
Pindigheb Tehsil	150,458	90.09%	13,112	7.85%	3,347	2%	40	0.02%	0	0%	50	0.03%	167,007	100%
Talagong Tehsil	125,512	91.94%	7,616	5.58%	3,380	2.48%	4	0%	0	0%	4	0%	136,516	100%
Fatehjang Tehsil	127,601	92.41%	3,135	2.27%	7,346	5.32%	5	0%	0	0%	1	0%	138,088	100%
Note1: British Punjab province era tehsil borders are not an exact match in the present-day due to various bifurcations to tehsil borders — which since created new tehsils — throughout the historic Punjab Province region during the post-independence era that have taken into account population increases. Note2: Tehsil religious breakdown figures for Christianity only includes local Christians, labeled as "Indian Christians" on census. Does not include Anglo-Indian Christians or British Christians, who were classified under "Other" category.

=== Languages ===
Languages of Attock district (2023)
1. Punjabi (65.2%)
2. Pashto (15.6%)
3. Hindko (14.4%)
4. Urdu (2.68%)
5. Others (2.05%)

In the 2023 census, 65.23% of the population identified their first language as Punjabi, 14.45% as Hindko, 15.59% as Pashto and 2.68% as Urdu. In the previous census of 1998, the multiple-choice question did not have an option for Hindko; the percentages were 87% for Punjabi, 8.3% for Pashto and 1.1% Urdu.

The Punjabi dialect of the eastern Fateh Jang Tehsil is called Sohāī̃ and belongs to the Dhani dialect group. The dialects of Pindi Gheb Tehsil (called Ghebi) and of Attock (sometimes called Chhachi) have been classified as a sub-dialect of Hindko dialect.

== Education ==
Attock has a total of 1,287 government schools out of which 51 percent (657 schools) are for female students. The district has an enrolment of 224,487 in public sector schools.

== See also ==
- Kamra, Pakistan
- Pothohar Plateau
