= Prithi Chand =

Sikh sect leader (1558–1618)

Baba Prithi Chand
- ਪ੍ਰਿਥੀ ਚੰਦ
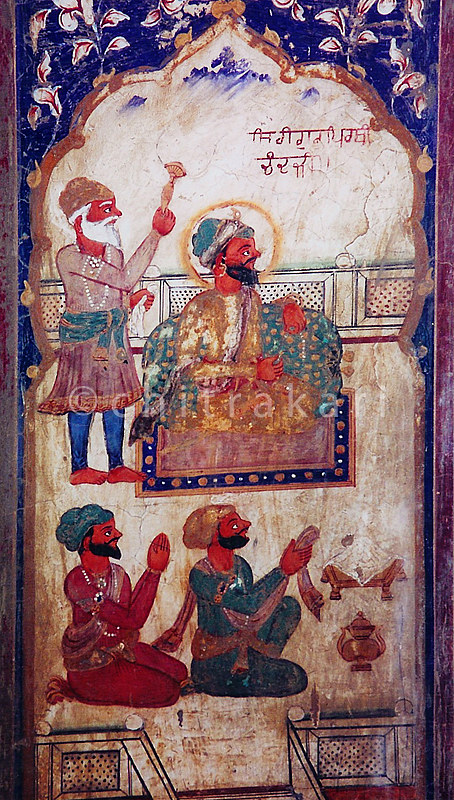
- Fresco artwork of Prithi Chand with attendants and devotees from Pothi-Mala, Guru Harsahai, Punjab

Head of Mina sect
- Preceded by: None (founder)
- Succeeded by: Manohar Das

Personal life
- Born: 1558 Goindval, Tarn Taran, Punjab
- Died: April 1618 (aged 59–60) Hehar, Punjab
- Spouse: Karmo
- Parents: Guru Ram Das (father); Mata Bhani (mother)
- Relatives: Baba Mahadev (brother); Guru Arjan (youngest brother)

Religious life
- Religion: Sikhism
- Sect: Mina (Miharvan)

Religious career
- Based in: Hehar, Punjab; Kotha Guru, Bathinda, Punjab

Prithi Chand (Gurmukhi: ਪ੍ਰਿਥੀ ਚੰਦ; 1558–April 1618), also spelt as Prithia, was the eldest son of Guru Ram Das – the fourth Guru of Sikhism, and the eldest brother of Guru Arjan – the fifth Guru. He founded the heretical Mina sect of Sikhism. Prithia based his movement out of Heir village, located in present-day Lahore district in Punjab, Pakistan. (Note: The name of Heir village is alternatively spelt as 'Hehar' or 'Hair'.)

== Spiritual career ==
=== Attempt at inheriting the Sikh guruship ===
Prithia wanted to inherit the Sikh guruship from his father, Guru Ram Das, who instead favored and appointed his youngest son Arjan Dev as the next Sikh guru. Chand was embittered and notably started one of the major sects of early Sikhism. This sect came to be labelled as the Minas, literally "unscrupulous scoundrels", by his competition. According to The Encyclopaedia Britannica, Prithi Chand was "distinctly hostile" of his brother's appointment as Guru. His unscrupulous means and support for atrocities committed by the Mughal empire, did not find favour with Guru Ram Das, who bestowed the guruship on Guru Arjan. Modern scholars have called his movement as one of the unorthodox sects that emerged in the history of Sikhism.

In his antics to have the guruship be inherited by him, Prithia had concealed letters that his brother Arjan Dev had written from Lahore while attending a wedding so that the letters could not reach Guru Ram Das. The Sikh guruship by this point came with not only spiritual authority but also temporal power and wealth, as large tracts of lands were controlled by Guru Ram Das (after Akbar rewarded it to the Sikhs), and distant congregations and large amounts of followers submitted donations to the Sikh guru, thus Prithia coveted these perks. However, Guru Ram Das eventually discovered the plans of Prithia and how he had hid the letters, leading to his banishment.

=== Establishing his own religious seat ===
After being passed over for the Sikh guruship and being disowned by his father, Prithi Chand established his own spiritual seat in Kotha Guru (about 35 kilometers northeast of Bathinda). While Guru Arjan was finalizing the establishment of the Darbar Sahib complex in Amritsar, Prithia on the other hand was constructing a large complex in Heir village to boost his sect. Prithia selected Heir as his sect's base as it was strategically located on the road connecting the cities of Amritsar and Lahore and it was also where his wife's family resided. Thus, the thinking was that the Minas could intercept pilgrims travelling toward Guru Arjan's seat in Amritsar and try to convince them to join ranks with the Minas instead. Also, Prithia communicated with masands to plea his case for the Sikh guruship and convince them to side with him. Prithia attempted to convince others that Guru Arjan was the unright usurper of the guru gaddi (seat of the guru) and to support him instead. Through these efforts, the Minas managed to win-over two rababis with the promise of monetary rewards, namely Balvand and Satta, who were previously employed in the court of Guru Arjan. This was a major loss for the mainstream Sikhs and a win for the Minas due to the importance that rababis have in the Sikh faith. Eventually, Bhai Luddha of Lahore managed to convince Balvand and Satta to return to the employment of Guru Arjan.

Chand was an accomplished devotional poet, however, he did not use his talents to good means. He created a parallel scripture which included the hymns of earlier gurus and his own poetry. His spiritual discourses used teachings of Sikh gurus but were aimed to attract his own following and the official support of the Mughal Empire. His followers forcibly and by covert means, gained control of the Sikh holy city of Amritsar and neighboring region, while Guru Hargobind – the sixth Guru of Sikhism, had to relocate his Guruship to the Himalayan Shivalik foothills. Chand and his followers tried to establish his own Guruship opposing Guru Arjan and Guru Hargobind as the official followers of Guru Nanak – the founder of Sikhism. His poetic abilities and use of hymns of Guru Nanak for his ulterior motives is believed to have likely triggered Guru Arjan to compose the official first manuscript of the Adi Granth.

There was a bitter attempt by Prithi Chand and his followers to oppose Guru Arjan for three generations. Prithia is also charged by Sikhs as being involved with the execution of Guru Arjan by the Mughals. He conspired with Chandu Shah, an official from Lahore, against the Guru at the suggestion of his wife, Karmo. In contemporary Sikhism, the followers and movement led by Prithi Chand are considered as "dissenters". In the hagiographies and Sikh history, Chand is accused of attempting to poison Hargobind when he was a young boy. He and his descendants – his son, Manohar Das (Meharban) and Mehrban's son, Harji (Hariji) conspired with the Muslim leaders such as Sulahi Khan to hurt and end the later Sikh Gurus, as well prevent them from entering Amritsar. However, Minas' literature does not support these allegations, on the contrary presenting Chand as a devout supporter of Guru Arjan and suggesting a likely "bias" against Chand.

== Death ==
Prithi Chand died at Kotha Guru in 1618. A samadh dedicated to Prithi Chand was raised in Heir village after his death.

== Succession ==
His son Manohar Das, popularly known as Meharban, was attached to both his father Prithi Chand and his uncle Guru Arjan. Meharban succeeded as the next leader of the Mina sect after Prithia's death. He was also a literary talent and a "luminary among medieval Sikh and Panjabi litterateurs" states Syan, and he composed hymns under the pen name of Prithi Chand. After Meharban's death, the mantle of leadership passed on to Harji, another talented poet and devotionist. It was under the leadership of Harji that the sect took over management of the Darbar Sahib in Amritsar, apparently barring Guru Tegh Bahadur from entering the site.

Prithi Chand and his early Sikh sect claimed to have the Guru Harsahai pothi, the earliest compiled Sikh scripture from the time of Guru Nanak. According to the literature of the Miharvan Sikhs, the pothi was given to Prithi Chand by Guru Arjan and this was in part the reason they claimed authenticity of their hymns and movement.

Meharban had been responsible for instigating the Mughal emperor Shah Jahan against Guru Hargobind, leading to the Early Mughal-Sikh Wars, much like his father before him had instigated emperor Jahangir against Guru Arjan.

The Minas continued to oppose the mainstream Sikh gurus until the guruship of Guru Tegh Bahadur. After the death of Harji, the sect gradually declined and eventially went extinct for the most part.

== Legacy ==
The wars of Guru Gobind Singh against the Muslim commanders and the rise of the Khalsa brotherhood ultimately ended the control of Amritsar by the followers of Prithi Chand. His movement and the "Minas" sect thereafter became largely extinct. According to Gurinder Singh Mann, the Sodhis of Guru Harsahai (35 kilometers west of Faridkot) and of Malwa region are the descendants of the Prithi Chand and Miharvan movement.

The samadh of Prithi Chand can still be found at Heir village off of Bedian road in Lahore district. However, it now exists in a decaying and neglected condition, consisting of a pavilion standing in a large plot of land. The sarovar (sacred pool) of the site has dried-up.
