= Tomb of the Hakims =

16th-century mausoleum in Pakistan

- قبرہ حکیموں
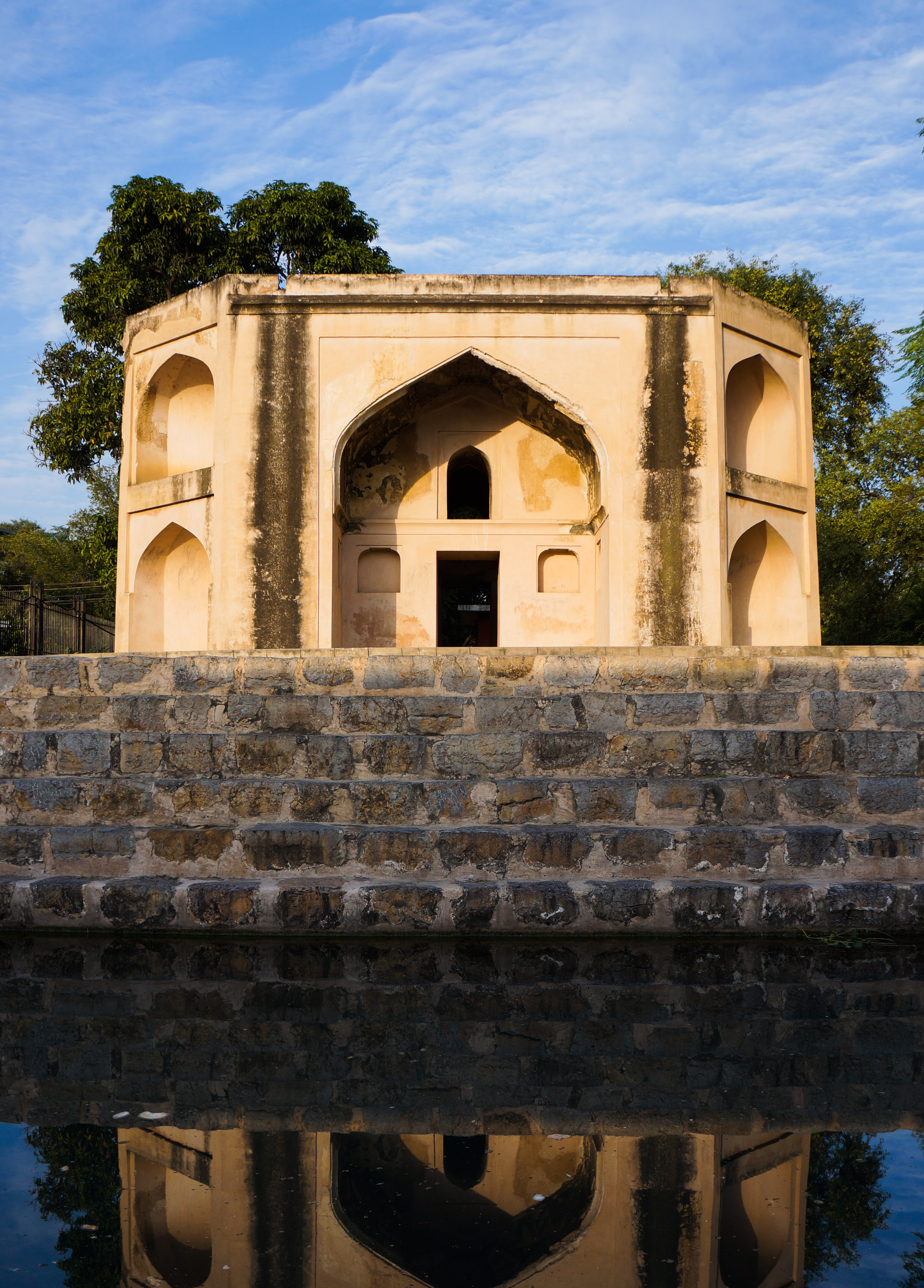
- Interactive map of Tomb of the Hakims
- Location: Hasan Abdal, Punjab, Pakistan
- Coordinates: 33.8212°N 72.6908°E
- Completion date: 1597

Hakim's Tomb (Urdu: مقبرہ حکیموں) is a 16th-century tomb located in the city of Hasan Abdal, Pakistan, across from the Gurdwara Panja Sahib. The tomb complex also includes the Tomb of Lala Rukh, traditionally attributed to a Mughal princess. The tomb was built for two physicians (Hakims) at the Mughal court, the brothers Hakim Abdul Fateh Gilani Masiuddin, and Hakim Humayun Khwaja Gilani.

== History ==
The tomb was ordered to be built by the Mughal emperor Akbar's minister and superintendent of construction, Khawaja Shamsuddin Khawafi. Khwaja had intended the tomb to be built for himself between 1581 and 1583, but the two royal Hakimss were buried there at the command of Emperor Akbar in 1597. Akbar visited the site after returning from one of his trips to Kashmir.

== Architecture ==
The tomb is octagonal and is a two-story structure. A large Persian style iwan gateway arch is found on each of the cardinal sides of the tomb, and span the height of both stories. Flanking the large iwans are four smaller niches - also built in the Persian style. The tomb is fronted by a small fish pond.
