= Monno Nagar =

- Village
- Location within Pakistan
- Coordinates: 33.819487°N 72.689026°E
- Country: Pakistan
- Province: Punjab
- District: Attock
- Tehsil: Hazro
- Region: Hasan Abdal
- Time zone: UTC+5 (PST)

Monno Nagar is a village near the town of Hassan Abdal in Punjab province, Pakistan. It is 20 km from Attock and 70 km from Rawalpindi.

Most people are ethnic Punjabi, and so speak the Punjabi language and wear Shalwar kameez on all occasions.
