= Tomb of Lala Rukh =

Tomb of Lala Rukh مقبرہ لالہ رخ
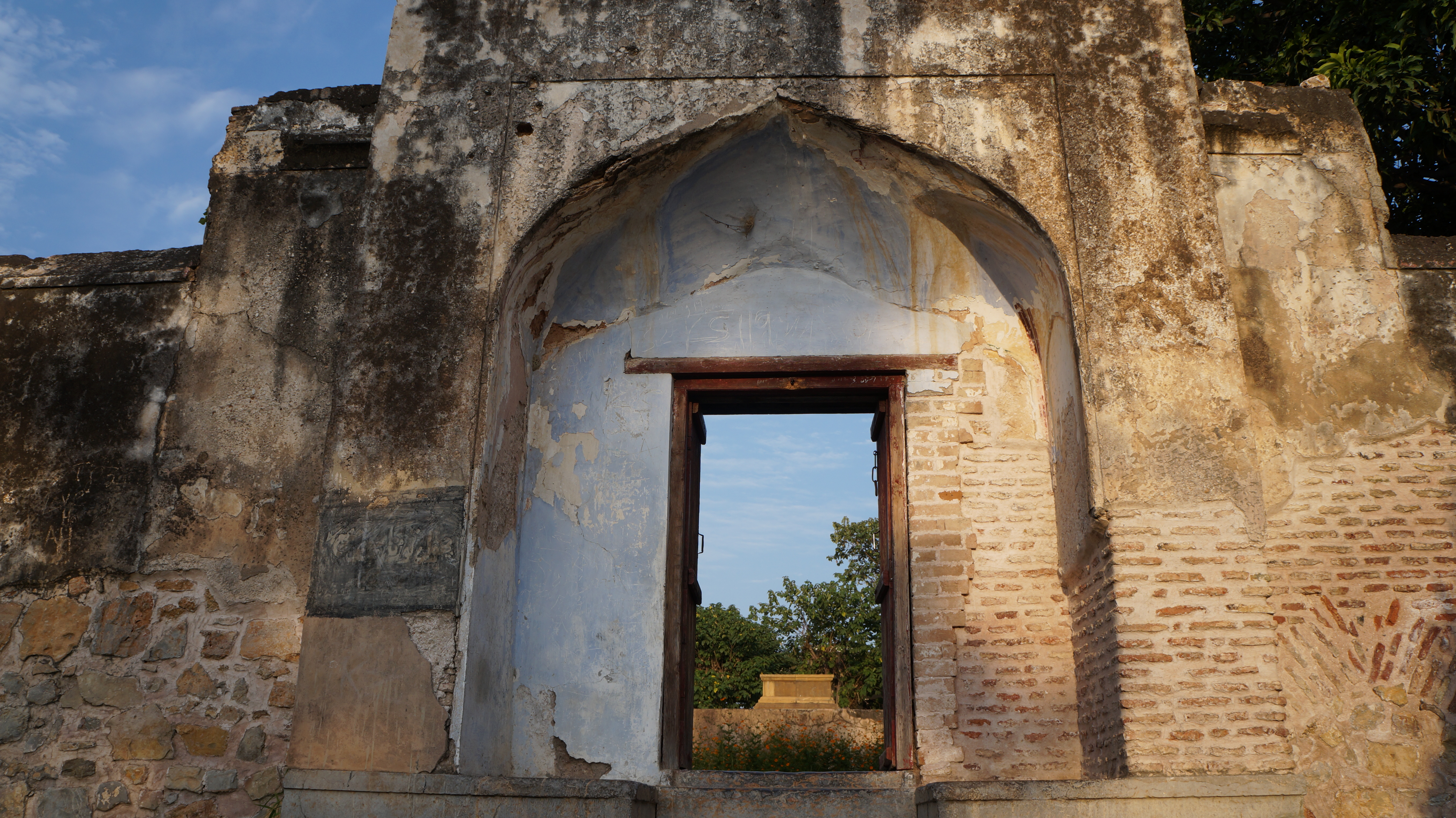
- Tomb of Lala Rukh
- Interactive map of Tomb of Lala Rukh مقبرہ لالہ رخ
- Location: Hasan Abdal, Punjab, Pakistan
- Coordinates: 33°49′15.37″N 72°41′25.64″E

Tomb of Lala Rukh (Urdu: مقبرہ لالہ رخ) is a historical tomb in Hasan Abdal, Punjab, Pakistan, that is traditionally attributed to Princess Lala Rukh, daughter of the Mughal emperor Akbar.

== Location ==
The tomb is located on the Islam Shaheed road in Hasan Abdal, Attock District, in present-day Punjab, Pakistan. The tomb is just opposite to the Gurdwara Panja Sahib and the Hakimon ka Maqbara.

== Descriptions ==
Descriptions of the tomb can be found in the travels of William Moorcroft, Charles von Hügel, Alexander Burnes, George Elphinstone Dalrymple and Allan Cunningham.
