= Jori (instrument) =

Indian and Punjabi/Sikh musical instrument (twin hand drums)

Jori/Jodi/Dhamma/Punjabi Pakhvaj
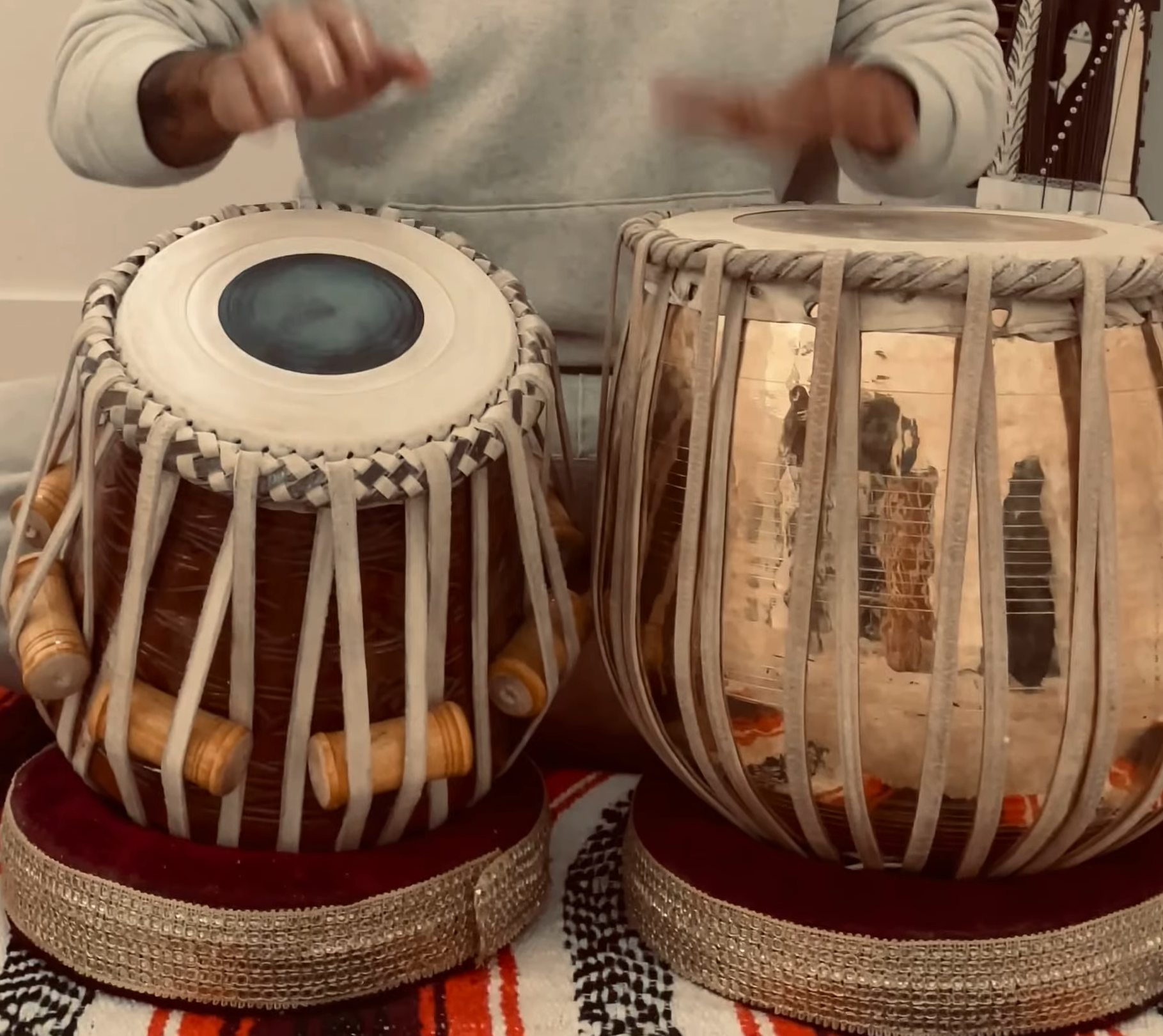

Percussion instrument
- Classification: Membranophone percussion instrument
- Inventor: Sri Guru Arjun Dev Ji
- Developed: 16th century

Playing range
- One octave (variable) low

Related instruments
- Tabla, Pakhavaj, mridangam, khol, dholak, nagara, madal, tbilat, bongos

Musicians
- Sukhvinder Singh 'Pinky', Bhai Baldeep Singh, Bhai Jasdeep Singh, Bhai Surdarshan Singh and Bhai Gian Singh Naamdhari

More articles or information
- https://www.sikhmusicalheritage.com/jori

Jori, Jodi, Dhamma, or Jorhi (Gurmukhi: ਜੋੜੀ; sometimes Jori-Pakhawaj, Gurmukhi: ਜੋੜੀ ਪਖਾਵਜ) is a South Asian percussion instrument made up of two individual drums. The Jori originates from the Punjab region of South Asia. Historically, the Jori has accompanied Gurbani Kirtan. Prominent exponents of the Jori include Ustad Sukhvinder Singh "Pinky". Bhai Baldeep Singh, Sardar Jasdeep Singh, Bhai Surdarshan Singh and Bhai Gian Singh Namdhari.

In its construction, the Jori is similar to the Tabla. The key differences being the use of a larger dayan/chathoo (also known as Poorra) (treble drum), and a wooden barrel-shaped bayan/dagga (bass drum) with atta (dough) instead of the syahi/gub, which is called a "Dhamma" .

== History and origin ==
The Jori, Jodi, or Jorhi was first created by the fifth Sikh guru, Guru Arjun Dev Ji when 2 bards of his court, Satta and Balwand, wanted to separate the much older and venerable Pakhavaj into two instruments, similar to the tabla. Due to this, the Jori and Tabla are often confused as the same instrument, although these two instruments make completely different sounds, and the Jori is almost always much lower than the Tabla and does not produce a sharp sound. Visually the dayaan/chathoo (also known as Poorra) drum is quite similar to the tabla's dayaan/chathoo, but has a wider circumference. The way the instrument is played also differs, as with the Tabla a striking motion is used to produce a sharp sound, but an open hand, soft motion is used to produce sound on a Jori. The Tabla bass drum is made from metal, whereas both Jori drums are made of tun wood, which is classed as the best quality wood for musical instruments.

== Use in gurbani and kirtaan ==
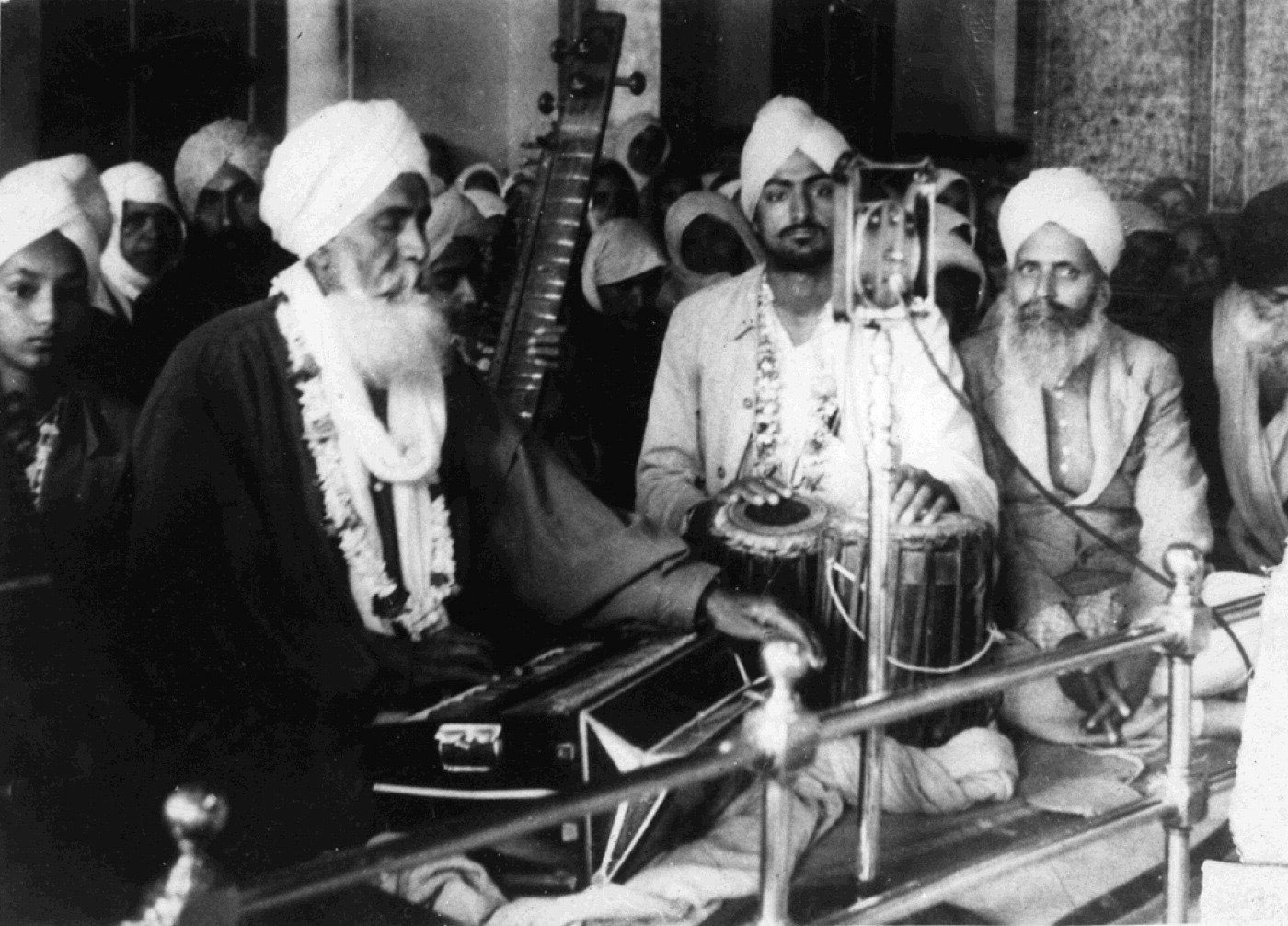
Photograph of Bhai Jawala Singh Ragi playing accordion (vaaja), Bhai Gurcharn Singh on Jori, and Bhai Avtar Singh on Taus at Gurdwara Dehra Sahib, Lahore, ca.1935.jpg

As a Sikh instrument, the Jori, also known as Punjab's Pakhawaj, was used alongside the rubab or rabab in Gurbani/Kirtan, which is a form of devotional prayer and singing in the Sikh religion. Over a gradual period of time, and especially after the Partition of Punjab in 1947, most rabab players (which have historically been Muslim since the times of the first Sikh Gurus) emigrated to Lehnda Punjab, Pakistan, This took a way a key part of the Jori playing symphony, and the rabab was replaced with more canonically Indian instruments, such as the harmonium to replace missing melody. It has since been replaced in most of these settings by the Tabla, but the similar appearance between these two instruments confuses many to this day, especially with comparison to Qawwali and Pakistani/Afghan Tablas, which also use a similar cylindrical drum called a Dhamma. for producing bass sounds (and also have a missing syahi/gub). A Qawwali Dhamma is lightweight, smaller, and has more of a deep thud sound great for Keherwa and Daadra Accompaniment. A Jori Dhamma is bigger, much heavier, and has more of an open sound. While it is still a very deep sound, there is a notable difference in the classical depth. The Namdhari sect of Sikhism is known for their exceptional usage of this instrument.
