= Babak (Rababi) =

Sikh musician and warrior

Bhai Babak
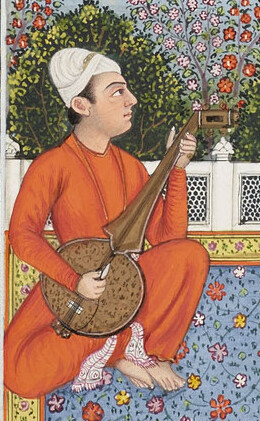
- Detail of a rababi (possibly Bhai Babak) from a painting of Guru Hargobind (the sixth Sikh Guru) listening to music, from a series of painting of the first nine Sikh gurus, circa 1800–1840

Personal life
- Died: 1642 Amritsar, Punjab
- Known for: Rababi

Religious life
- Religion: Sikhism

Babak (died 1642), was a Sikh rababi or musician, who kept Guru Hargobind company and recited sacred hymns at morning and evening.

== Biography ==
He was a Muslim at birth. His name Babak, from Persian, means faithful. Babak performed the final rites of Bhai Satta and Rai Balvand. Babak did this by digging the graves for the deceased on the banks of the River Ravi. After the service he performed the kirtan on the site where Guru Hargobind sat. He took part in the Battle of Amritsar in 1634 where he helped evacuate Bibi Veero, Guru Hargobind's daughter, to Guru Hargobind's camp. Before Guru Hargobind passed away he asked Babak to return to Amritsar. Babak listened to the Guru and retired to Amritsar where he died in 1642. His last words are said to be, “Waheguru”.

== See also ==
- Bhai Mardana
- Balvand Rai
- Satta Doom
