= Salok Mardana =

Salok Mardana ਸਲੋਕ ਮਰਦਾਨਾ
- by Guru Nanak
- Original title: Salok Mardana 1
- First published in: Adi Granth, 1604
- Country: India
- Language: Gurmukhi
- Subject(s): Description on Mardana
- Genre(s): Religion
- Meter: Salok
- Lines: 3 Stanzas
- Pages: 553
- Preceded by: Salok M3 (ਸਲੋਕ ਮਃ ੩)
- Followed by: Pauri and Salok M3 (ਸਲੋਕ ਮਃ ੩)

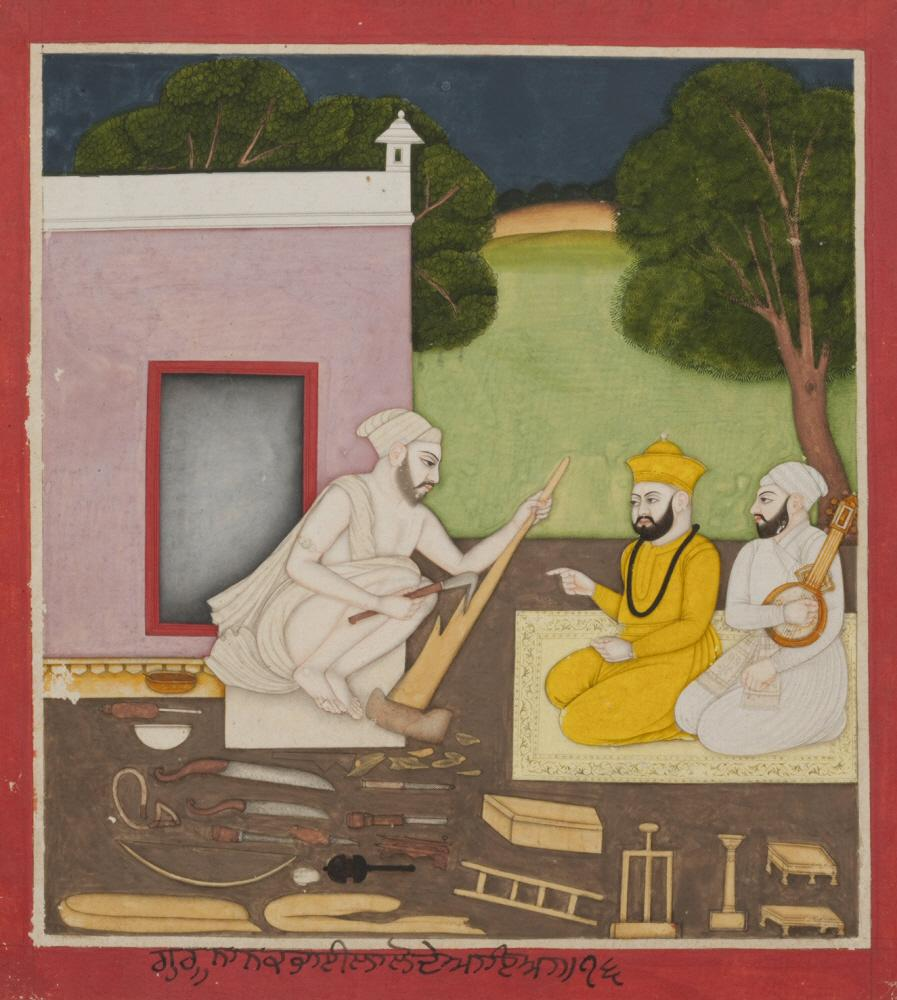
Painting of Guru Nanak and Mardana from a Janamsakhi Manuscript

Salok Mardana (Punjabi: ਸਲੋਕ ਮਰਦਾਨਾ) are two Saloks, present in Sikh religious text and eternal guru Guru Granth Sahib on Ang 553. The authorship of these Shaloks are controversial among different scholars. Mardana literally means manly or macho.

== Authorship ==
There are three major views regarding authorship of these Shaloks:

- The Shalok was written by Guru Nanak in response to Bhai Mardana, on asking difference between Gurmukh and Manmukh., When he asked about Intoxication of Gurmukh and Manmukh.
- The Shalok was written by Bhai Mardana and sung by Nanak
- The Shalok was written by Guru Nanak and Mardana title is given due to machismo nature of Shalok and have no relation with Bhai Mardana.

Although it is widely believed that these Shalok belong to Guru Nanak, as pen name Nanak is used in these Saloks.

== Saloks ==
First Salok states: Shalok Mardana 1: The Dark Age of Kali Yuga is the vessel, filled with the wine of sexual desire; the mind is the drunkard. Anger is the cup, filled with emotional attachment, and egotism is the server. Drinking too much in the company of falsehood and greed, one is ruined. So let good deeds be your distillery, and Truth your molasses; in this way, make the most excellent wine of Truth. Make virtue your bread, good conduct the ghee, and modesty the meat to eat. As Gurmukh, these are obtained, O Nanak; partaking of them, one's sins depart.

Second Salok states: Marḏānā 1:The human body is the vat, self-conceit is the wine, and desire is the company of drinking buddies. The cup of the mind's longing is overflowing with falsehood, and the Messenger of Death is the cup-bearer. Drinking in this wine, O Nanak, one takes on countless sins and corruptions. So make spiritual wisdom your molasses, the Praise of God your bread, and the Fear of God the meat you eat. O Nanak, this is the true food; let the True Name be your only Support. ||2||

Third Stanza of Second shalok states: If the human body is the vat, and self-realization is the wine, then a stream of Ambrosial Nectar is produced. Meeting with the Society of the Saints, the cup of the Lord's Love is filled with this Ambrosial Nectar; drinking it in, one's corruptions and sins are wiped away. ||3||
