= Syahi =

South Asian percussion tuning paste

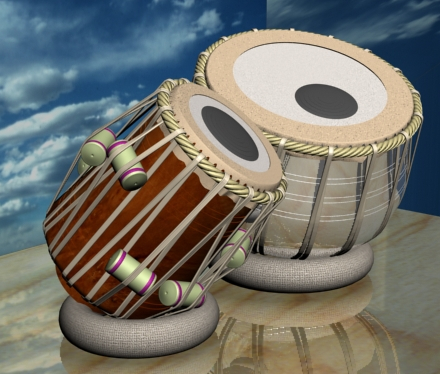
Set of tabla, with the syahi applied

A close-up of a syahi

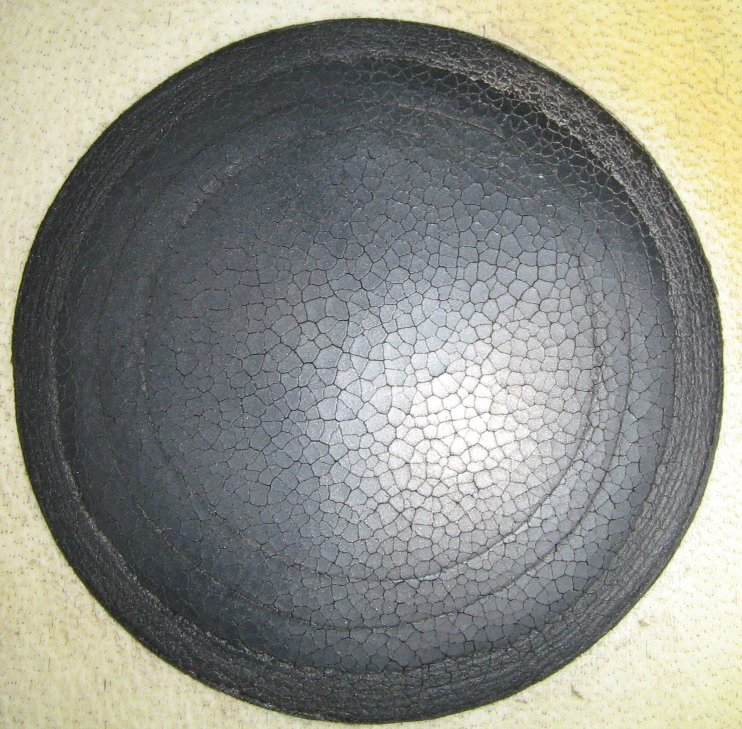
Close-up of patch of tuning paste

Syahi (also known as gaab, ank, satham or karanai) is the tuning paste applied to the head of many South Asian percussion instruments like the dholki, jori, tabla, madal, mridangam, khol and pakhavaj.

== Overview ==
Syahi is usually black in colour, circular in shape and is made of a mixture of flour, water and iron filings. Originally, syahi was a temporary application of flour and water. Over time it has evolved into a permanent addition.

== Function ==
Syahi functions by loading only a portion of the stretched skin with weight. In the higher-pitched (usually right-hand) drum (for instance, the tabla proper) this has the effect of altering the resonance frequency of some lower order vibrations more than others. The action on the left hand drum is a little different. On the other side (for instance, the bāyāñ in the tabla), its position is offset and serves simply to lower the resonance frequency.

== Application ==
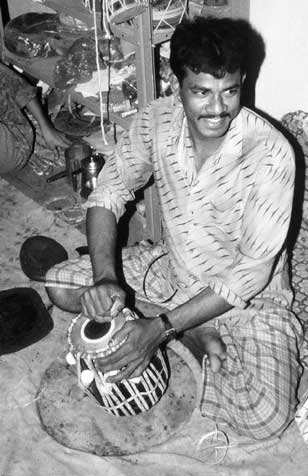
A Pakistani craftsman applying the syahi (Hyderabad, Sind, Pakistan - circa 1977)

The application of the syahi is very involved. It starts with a base layer of mucilage, followed by the application of numerous thin layers of syahi masala (flour, water, iron filings and other secret ingredients), which are then rubbed with a stone. Not all of the layers are the same size, but the final product is almost always shaped as a circle.

The stone abrasion is crucial to creating the syahi. The material from which the syahi is made is inherently inflexible; if it were simply applied in a single layer and allowed to harden, it would not allow the drum to vibrate freely. The process of rubbing or polishing with the stone creates a tight latticework of cracks which extend down to the very base of the syahi, allowing the skin to resonate freely, despite the inherent firmness of the syahi.

== Producing the latticework ==
The process from the application of the first layer of glue and the finesse in adding the subsequent layers of syahi is the main determinant of the resulting tonal purity of the instrument and also of the longevity of the layers.

Once the preliminary leatherskin 'Puri' is fastened onto the face of the tabla, the craftsman applies the glue in a circle on the surface leaving a half-inch margin from the 'Chati'. When the glue is about to set, the syahi is applied in a 2–3 mm thick layer over the glue with small spikes in the syahi layer. Once the syahi is semi-hardened and not yet dry, the rubbing with the stone begins. The rubbing continues till it removes the spikes and a coarse surface results. On this, layers are then added in reducing concentric circles, each half to one mm thick. The essence lies in beginning the rubbing before the syahi completely hardens and continuing it till the surface is nearly dry when the new layer is added. The rubbing and its proper technique ensures that the layers are each uniformly thick, tapering slightly at the edges to smoothly merge in the layer below.

The process of rubbing generates heat in the paste applied and achieves the function of drying the paste and also the frictional vibration of the surface with the stone results in a fine latticework of cracks leaving grains of syahi attached only to the base of the layer below. This structure gives the instrument its sonority and tonal quality, and its harmonics which range from its tuned pitch of a few hundred Hertz to a few KiloHertz.

If the syahi is allowed to harden without rubbing it continuously, pockets of solidity would be left in the layers and distort the tone and also result in breakage of the grains from the layers within a short span, resulting in a jarring rattling sound during playing.

=== Wear ===
The layers, as the leatherskin on which they are applied, are vulnerable to humidity in the weather and also the moisture in the player's hand. Interaction with moisture results in melting of the black crystals. This is the reason why players frequently use powder to keep the hands dry while playing.
