= Khawaja Shamsuddin Khawafi =

Khawaja Shamsuddin Khawafi (d. 1600) was a Mughal official who served as minister and superintendent of construction during the reign of Akbar. He served as governor of Subah of Lahore between 1598 and 1600.

He was a son of Khwaja Alauddin, a native of Khawaf, and came to India during the reign of Akbar. He soon attained a position of trust. Attock Fort was built between 1581 and 1583 under his supervision to protect the passage of the Indus. The mausolea known as Hakimon ka Maqbara were also built by him. Shamsuddin was appointed to the Punjab when Akbar set out for the Deccan in 1598. He died at Lahore in 1600, and was succeeded in his office by Zain Khan Koka.
