= Hassan Abdal Tehsil =

Pakistani administrative area

Hassan Abdal Tehsil تحصیل حسن ابدال
- Tehsil
- Country: Pakistan
- Region: (Punjab, Pakistan) Punjab
- District: Attock
- Capital: Hassan Abdal

Population (2023)
  - Total: 253,670
- Time zone: UTC+5 (PST)

Hassan Abdal Tehsil (Urdu & Punjabi: تحصیل حسن ابدال), is a Tehsil (subdivision) of Attock District in the Punjab province of Pakistan. Hassan Abdal city is the headquarter of tehsil.
