= Bhai Mardana =

First Sikh and companion of Guru Nanak

Bhai Mardana Ji
- ਭਾਈ ਮਰਦਾਨਾ بھائی مردانہ
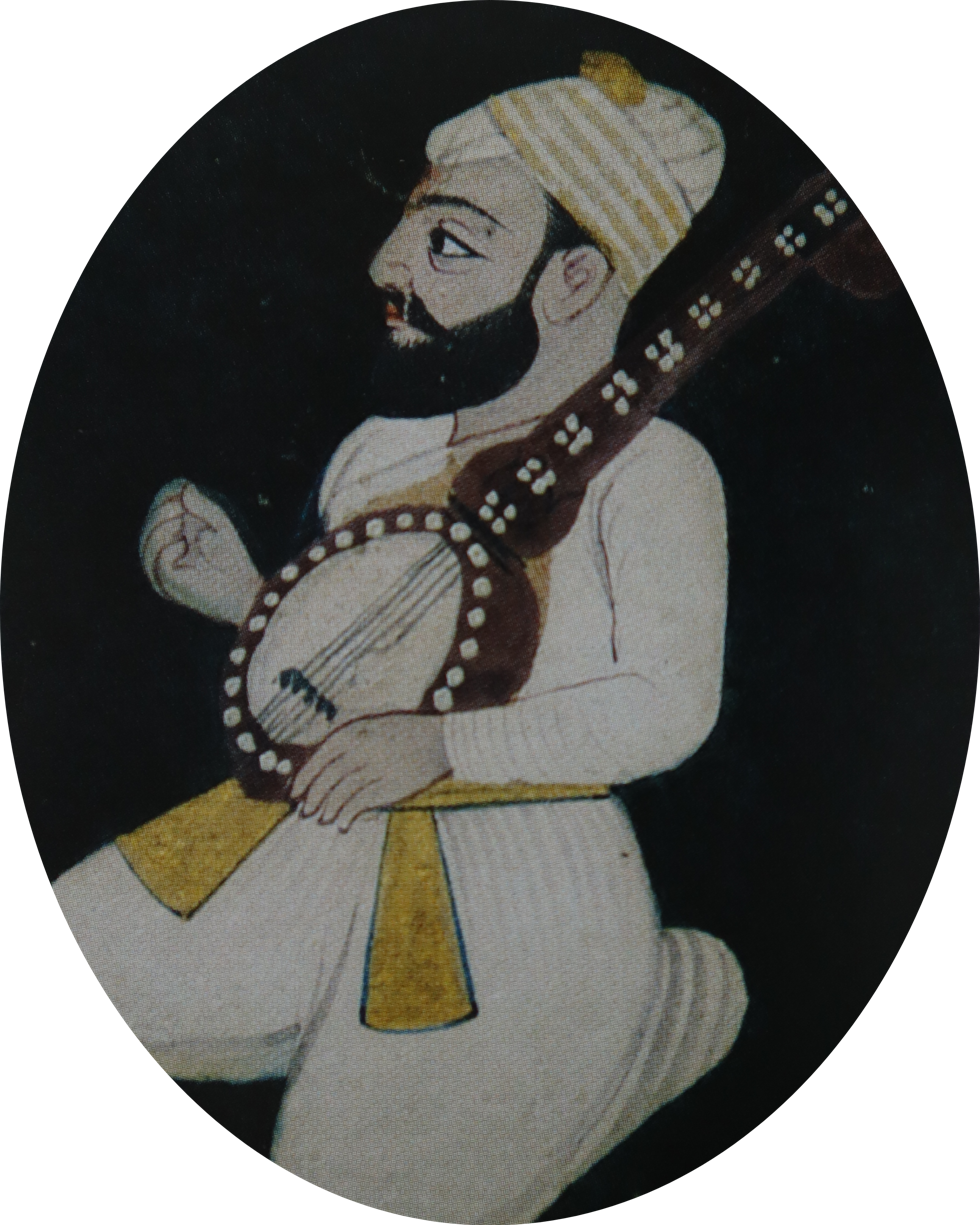
- Detail of Bhai Mardana from a Janamsakhi series of painting

Personal life
- Born: Dana Mirasi; 1459 Rai Bhoi Di Talwandi
- Died: 1534 (aged 74 or 75) Kartarpur, Punjab
- Cause of death: Illness
- Spouse: Bibi Rakhi
- Children: Baba Rajada (son); Baba Shajada (son); Kaki (daughter)
- Parents: Bhai Badre Mirasi (father); Bibi Lakho (mother)
- Known for: Companion of Guru Nanak
- Relatives: Banoo and Saloo (grandsons); Balwand (great-grandson); Sata (great-great-grandson)

Religious life
- Religion: Islam (birth); Sikhism (convert)

Bhai Mardana (Punjabi: ਭਾਈ ਮਰਦਾਨਾ; 1459 — 1534) was one of the first Sikhs and longtime companion of Guru Nanak Dev, first in the line of gurus noted in Sikhism. Bhai Mardana was a Muslim by-birth who would accompany Guru Nanak Dev on his journeys and became one of his first disciples and followers, and converted to the newly established religion. Bhai Mardana was born to a Mirasi Muslim family, a couple, Badra and Lakkho, of Rai Bhoi di Talwandi, now Nankana Sahib of Pakistan. He was the seventh born, all other children had died at birth. He had very good knowledge of music and played rabāb when Guru Nanak sung Gurbani.

== Guru Nanak and Bhai Mardana ==
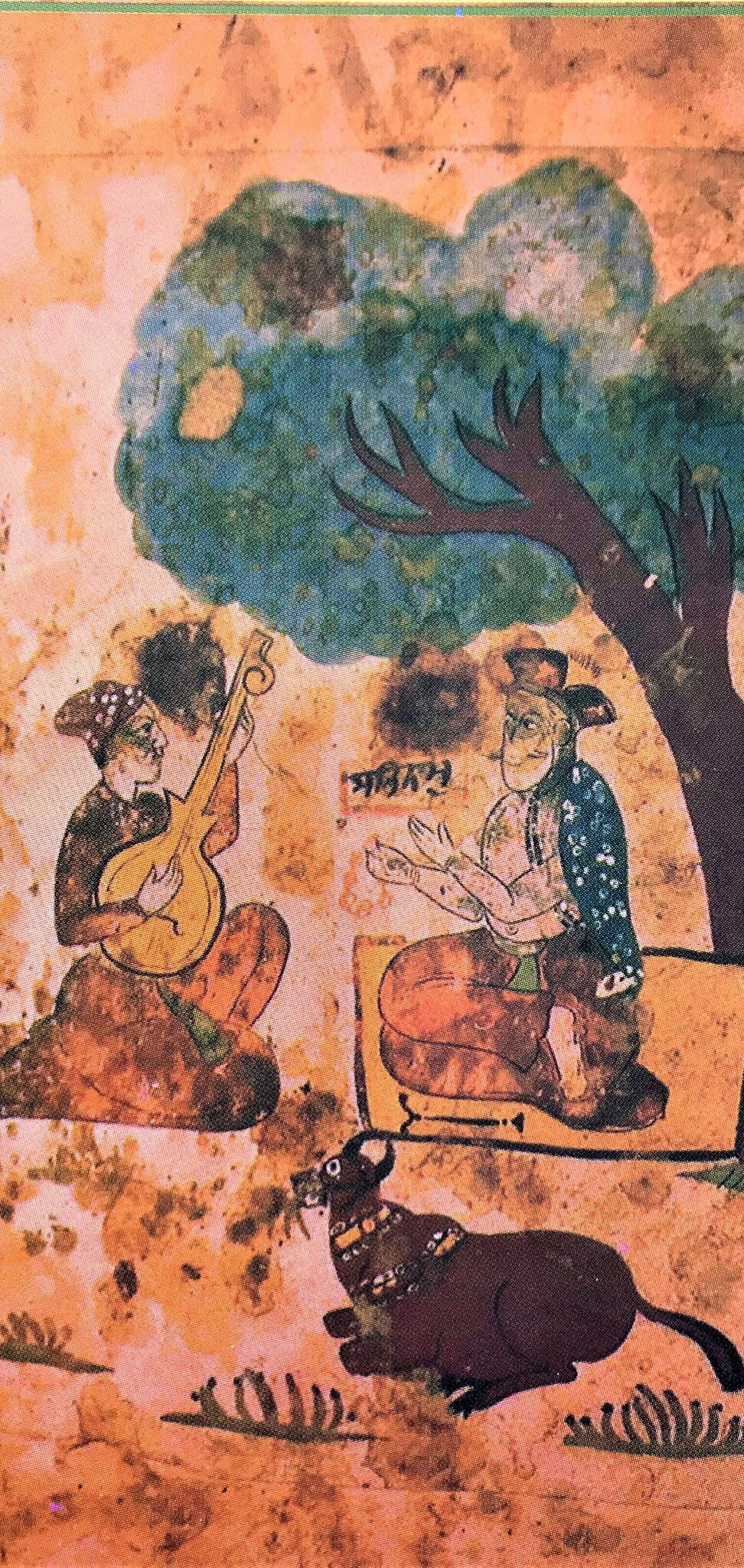
Portrait of Guru Nanak and Bhai Mardana from a folio within a Guru Granth Sahib manuscript dated to 1780 B.S. (1723 C.E.) housed at the Amar Chand Joshi Library of Panjab University Chandigarh

It is said that Bhai Mardana first contacted Guru Nanak to seek help as many people in his family were dying at a young age. Guru Nanak approached the family and had seen that Mardana's mother was crying because she felt her son will die. Mardana's mother told Guru Ji that the reason she was crying is because all her children were dying. Following this, Guru ji asked what her son's name was, to which she responded "MarJana" meaning "He will die". Guru Nanak kindly asked the mother if she is willing to give him her son so that she will not have to bear the burden of her child's death. The mother accepted this and gave her son to Guru Nanak Dev Ji to take care of. As a result of this, Guru Nanak Ji gave Mardana the assurance that henceforth people in his clan will not die early. It is said that Mar- Da- Na means 'Does not die' in Punjabi.

Guru Nanak and Mardana were brought up in the same village. The Miharban Janam Sakhi says that Mardana was ten years elder to Guru Nanak and was his companion since his childhood days. It further states that Mardana sang hymns written by Kabir, Trilochan, Ravidas, Dhanna and Beni. According to Ratan Singh Bhangu, Prachin Panth Prakash, Guru Nanak as a small boy gave Mardana a string instrument improvised from reeds to play on while he sang the hymns.

When Guru Nanak took charge of the granaries and stores of the Nawab of Sultanpur Lodhi, he became known for his generosity. Mardana, was by then married and had two sons and a daughter, Mardana went to meet Guru Nanak as Guru Nanak's father wanted news of his son, Mardana never went back from his trip and was with Guru Nanak from then on. He used to play the Rabab (r-a-baab ) or rebeck as Guru Nanak spoke/sang his words about God.

When Guru Nanak planned to travel the world to spread his message, he wanted Mardana to accompany him, Mardana wanted to marry off his daughter before doing so, Bhai Baghirath a disciple of Guru Nanak helped Mardana materially to enable the daughter's marriage and allow Mardana to accompany Guru Nanak.

The chronicles of their travels use Mardana to show worldly doubts and bring forth Guru Nanak Ji's message, in many situations Mardana is portrayed as doubtful and wanting clarifications in every situation. The Puratan Janam Sakhi tells of these situations.

At Kartarpur, Mardana, the Guru's faithful minstrel, advanced in years and wearied with his long wanderings and physical privations, fell ill. He felt that he had no hope of longer life, and resigned himself to man's inevitable fate. He had originally been a Muhammadan, but, being now a Sikh, the question arose as to how his body should be disposed of after death. The Guru said, 'A Brahman's body is thrown into water, a Khatri's is burnt in the fire, a Vaisya's is thrown to the winds, and a Sudra's is buried in the earth. Thy body shall be disposed of as thou pleasest.' Mardana replied, 'Through thine instruction the pride of my body hath totally departed. With the four castes the disposal of the body is a matter of pride. I deem my soul merely as a spectator of my body, and am not concerned with the latter. Wherefore dispose of it as thou pleasest.' Then the Guru said, 'Shall I make thee a tomb and render thee famous in the world.' Mardana replied, 'When my soul hath been separated from its bodily tomb, why shut it up in a stone tomb?' The Guru answered, 'Since thou knowest God and art therefore a Brahman, we shall dispose of thy body by throwing It into the river Ravi and letting it go with the stream. Sit down therefore on its margin in prayerful posture, fix-thine attention on God, repeat His name at every inspiration and expiration, and thy soul shall be absorbed in the light of God.' Mardana accordingly sat down by the river, and his soul separated from its earthly enclosure the following morning at a watch before day. The Guru then, by the aid of his Sikhs, consigned Mardana's body to the river Ravi, caused the Sohila to be read for his eternal repose, and concluded the obsequies by distributing karah parshad (sacred food). The Guru counselled Mardana's son Shahzada and his relations not to weep. There ought to be no lamentation for a man who was returning to his heavenly home, and therefore no mourning for Mardana. The Guru bade Shahzada remain with him in the same capacity as his father, and he would be held in equal honour. Accordingly, Shahzada, the Guru's faithful friend and minstrel, accompanied him to the time of his death.

Some claim the Bhai Mardana died in Baghdad, but this is factually incorrect .

== Salok ==
In the Granth Sahib there are three shlokas of the Guru, dedicated to Mardana, against the use of wine. The following, which may conveniently be given here, will suffice as a specimen:-

The barmaid is misery, wine is lust; man is the drinker.

The cup filled with worldly love is wrath, and it is served by pride.

The company is false and covetous, and is ruined by excess of drink.

Instead of such wine make good conduct thy yeast, truth thy molasses, God's name thy wine;

Make merits thy cakes, good conduct thy clarified butter, and modesty thy meat to eat.

Such things, O Nanak, are obtained by the Guru's favour by partaking of them sins depart.

Mardana also wrote poetry. One of his compositions appears in the Guru Granth Sahib in Bihagadre ki Var along with two others of Guru Nanak's addressed to Mardana. As per the composition Mardana is convinced that an evil body may be cleansed of sin in sangat (SGGS, 553).

== Gallery ==
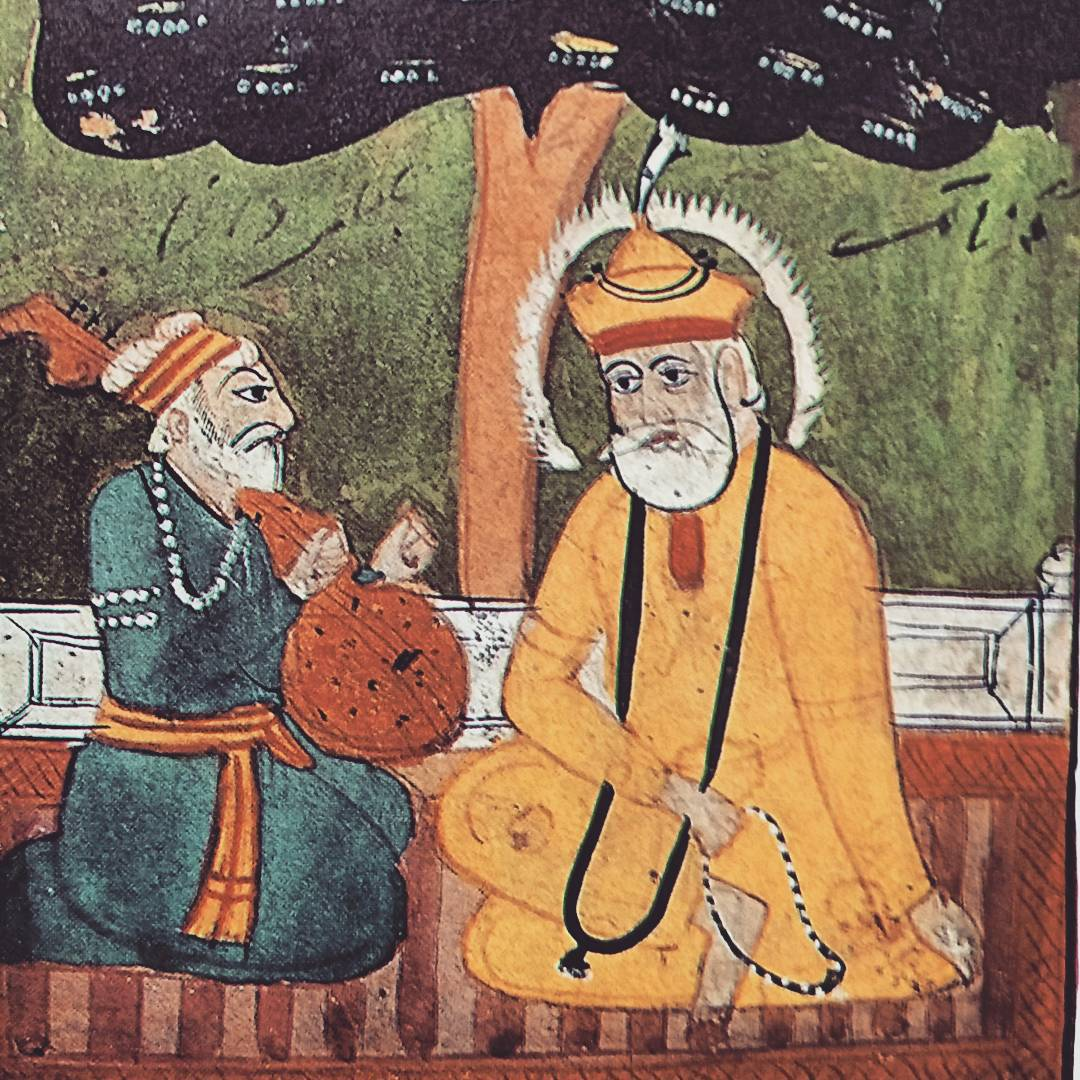
Mardana seated to the left of Nanak with his characteristic rabab

== See also ==
- Bhai Bala
- Salok Mardana
- Panja Sahib
- Rababi
- Balvand Rai
- Babak (Rababi)
- Satta Doom
