= Satta Doom =

Sikh drummer and author of the Guru Granth Sahib

Bhai Satta Doom
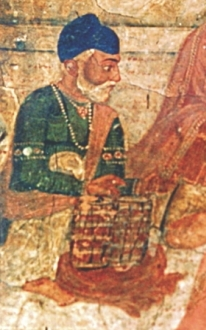
- Detail of a drummer playing the jori instrument, possibly Bhai Satta Doom, from a fresco of Guru Hargobind with Sikh musicians

Personal life
- Known for: Jori player; Contributor of the Guru Granth Sahib
- Relatives: Balvand Rai (brother)

Religious life
- Religion: Sikhism

Satta Doom (fl. late 16th to early 17th century), also spelt as Satta Dum, was a drummer and author of eight verses found within the Guru Granth Sahib.

== Biography ==
He was born a Muslim in a Doom-Mirasi family. He started playing music for the Sikhs during the guruship of Guru Angad. He was a drummer whilst his brother, Balvand Rai, was a rababi (rebec player). Some sources describe him as a rababi, like his brother, rather than a drummer. Other sources do not ascribe a brotherly blood relation between Satta Doom and Balvand Rai. They would play kirtan at the Sikh gurus' durbar (court). At some point, him and his brother abandoned the company and employment of the Guru but returned after facing hardships, where they were forgiven. They then wrote hymns for penance for their past mistakes, which would form part of the Adi Granth. The compositions he co-composed with his brother Balvand can be found on pages 966–968 of the Guru Granth Sahib under the title of Ramkali ki Vaar Rai Balwand tatta Satte doom akhi.

In his hymns, he emphasized the continuity of the guruship from Nanak to Angad, referring to the latter as having been sat on the takht (throne) of Nanak. It further praises the first five gurus of the Sikhs.

== See also ==
- Jori (instrument)
- Pakhawaj
- Sikh music
- Babak (Rababi)
- Bhai Mardana
