= Rababi =

Musician who plays the rabab

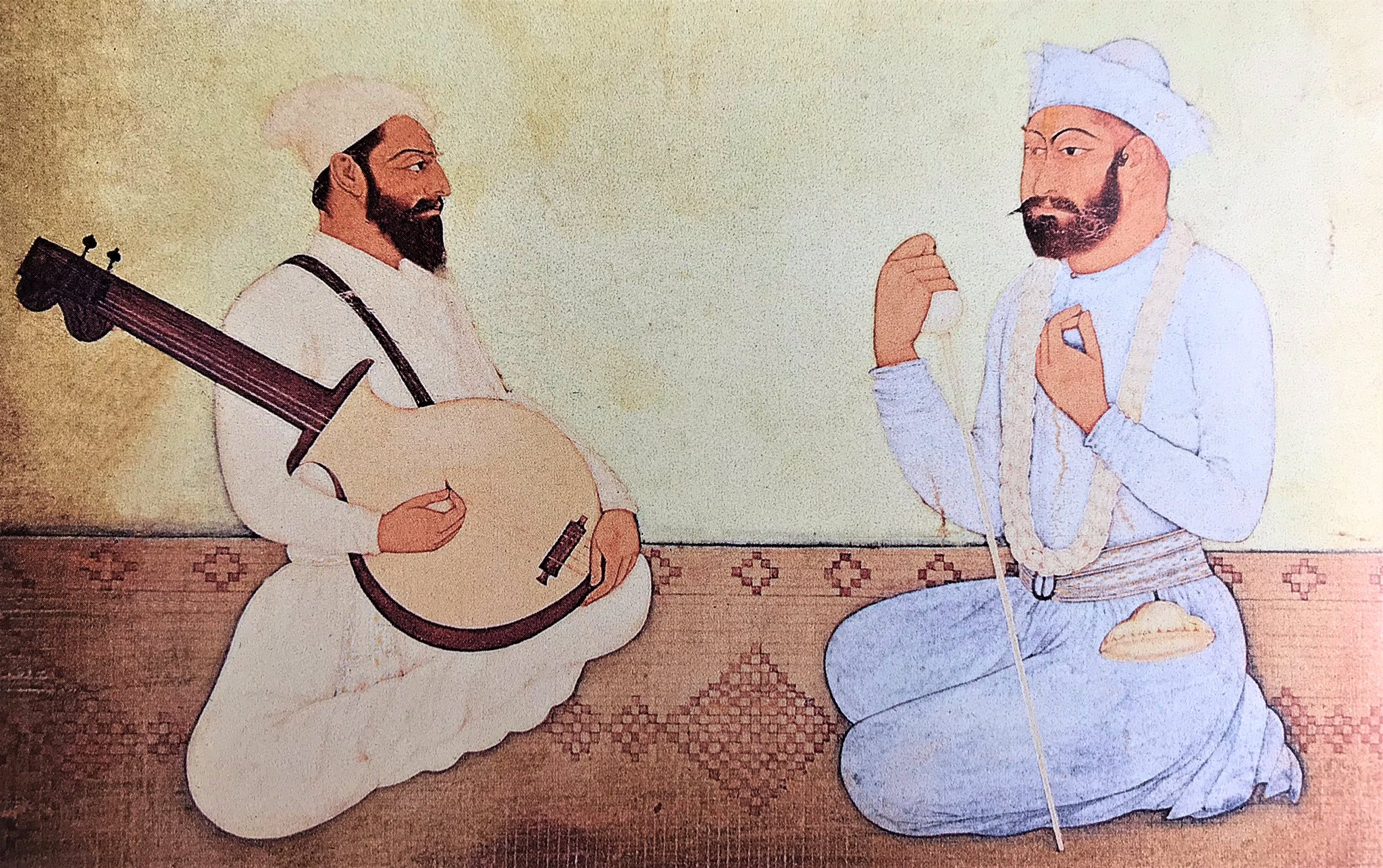
Guru Nanak (right) and Bhai Mardana (left) with rabab, c.1740 painting

Rababi (Gurmukhi: ਰਬਾਬੀ) is a term used to refer to a player of the rabab instrument.

In the Sikh liturgical tradition, there are three types of musicians—rababis, ragis, and dhadhis, all of which flourished during the period of the gurus. The descendants remained rababis to all the 10 gurus, keeping alive rabab music.

== History ==
Indian temple art of the first century A.D. depicted the Gandharan lute, though the ancestor of the rabab in India is likely the Persian instrument of the same name. The rabab, in its various forms, proliferated throughout West, Central, South and Southeast Asia. Those rababs used in Hindustani classical music of northern India are plucked.

Guru Nanak started the Sikh rababi tradition by engaging Bhai Mardana as his accompanist. The Muslim singers formerly called mirasi, were rechristened rababi by Nanak, because they played on the rabab.

Musical expression has held a very important place within the Sikh tradition ever since its beginning, with Guru Nanak and his faithful companion, Bhai Mardana. Textual traditions connecting Guru Nanak and Mardana to music include the Janamsakhis and the Varan of Bhai Gurdas. There are also artistic depictions of Guru Nanak and Mardana as musicians amid various 18th and 19th century paintings, where Guru Nanak is shown singing whilst Mardana is playing his instrument.

References made to music during the time of Guru Nanak found within the Varan of Bhai Gurdas, includes:

ghar ghar hove dharamsāl, hove kīrtan sadā visoā

Translation:

Every house was a place of worship with constant kīrtan as on Baisakhi

— Varan Bhai Gurdas 1:27

Regarding the Kartarpur chapter of Guru Nanak's life, Bhai Gurdas states:

sodaru ārtī gāvīai amrit vele jāpu uchārā

Translation:

Sodar and Ārtī were sung, and in the early morning Jāp was recited

— Varan Bhai Gurdas 1:38

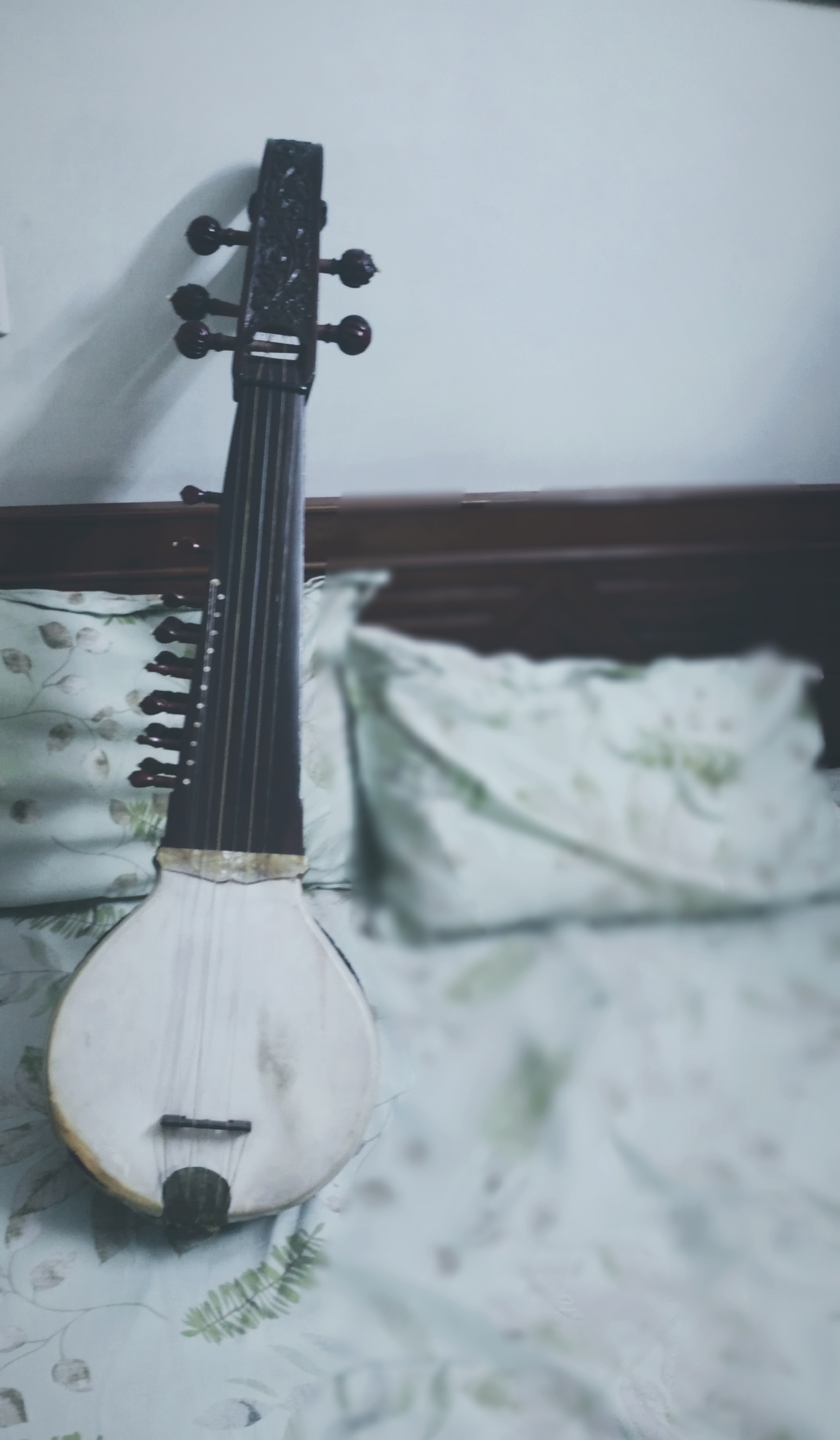
Firandia-style Rabab

Mardana was a player of the rabab (plucked lute), and would travel alongside Nanak and play the instrument when Nanak spoke his teachings. As a result of this, Mardana is credited as establishing the rababi tradition in Sikhism. When Guru Nanak received a revelation, he would exclaim: "Mardaneya! Rabab chhed, bani aayee hai" ['Mardana, play the rabab, bani (sacred composition/verse) has occurred to me'].

After Guru Nanak settled down in the locality he founded, known as Kartarpur, the accompanying verse compositions to the music him and Mardana conjured was recorded in various pothis, of which, the Guru Harsahai Pothi claims to be an extant text of this kind.

During the time of Guru Nanak, the predominant musical tradition of the era was the dhrupad and dhamar, which ended up influencing this early Sikh musical expression. Later, other musical traditions, such as khayal, tappa, and qawwali, began to influence the Sikhs.

The musical lineage of Bhai Mardana continued after Mardana's death and his descendants carried-on with serving the Sikh gurus as musical performers. Some examples of descendants of Bhai Mardana who worked as musicians in the durbar (court) of the Sikh gurus include:

- Sajada, whom served Guru Angad at Khadur
- Sadu and Badu, both of whom served Guru Amar Das in Goindwal and Guru Ram Das in Chak Ram Das Pura
- Balvand and Satta, both of whom served both Guru Ram Das and Guru Arjan
- Babak, who served Guru Hargobind
- Chatra, who served the later gurus

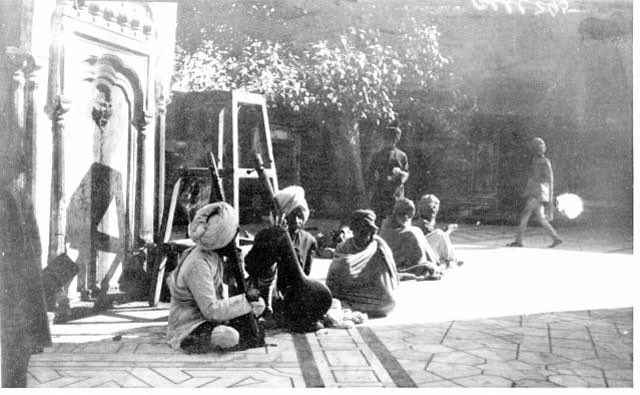
Photograph titled 'Lute [rabab/rebec] Players [rababis] near the Golden Temple', taken on 28 January 1903. Kept in the Gertrude Bell collection of Newcastle University.

The rababi tradition formed out of the lineage of Muslim musicians and instrumentalists performing kirtan for the Sikh gurus and the Sikh community. These Muslim rababis of kirtan were called Bābe ke by the Sikhs, which meant "those of Baba Nanak". A later Muslim rababi who performed kirtan at Sikh shrines, including the Harmandir Sahib, was Bhai Sain Ditta, who flourished during the early part of the 19th century. During this era, the Muslim rababi institution received patronage from various Sikh polities, such as Nabha, Patiala, and Kapurthala states. During the early 20th century, Muslim rababis who regularly performed at the Golden Temple were Bhai Chand, Bhai Taba, and Bhai Lal. By the 20th century, many rababis replaced their traditional rabab by swapping it out with the harmonium.

A blowback to the rabab instrument's usage in Sikh circles came in the aftermath of the partition of the Punjab in 1947, due to many Muslim rababi families migrating to their new homes in Pakistan or became pushed to the margins of society due to changing socio-cultural norms. The rabab was gradually replaced by the sarod, another stringed instrument, in Sikh musical circles. There have been attempts at reviving the rababi tradition, as there still remains descendants of traditional rababi families living.

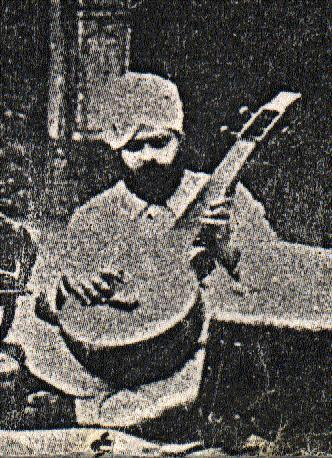
Photograph of a rababi of Nabha State holding a rabab

The last of the line of rababis was Bhai Chand. During the 20th century CE the instrument's use in Sikh kirtan was eclipsed by the harmonium but it has been revived. Muslim rababis used to perform kirtan regularly at Amritsar before the partition of India in 1947, after which many of the rababis migrated to what became Pakistan. The Sikh rabab was traditionally a local Punjabi variant known as the 'Firandia' rabab (Punjabi: ਫਿਰੰਦੀਆ ਰਬਾਬ Phiradī'ā rabāba), however Baldeep Singh, an expert in the Sikh musical tradition, challenges this narrative.

== Notable rababis ==
=== Sikhs ===
Noteworthy Sikh rababis include:

- Bhai Mardana
- Balvand Rai
- Balak (Rababi)

== See also ==
- Rebab
- Seni Rebab
- Sarod
