= Hasan Abdal =

City in Punjab, Pakistan

Hasan Abdal حسَن ابدال
- City
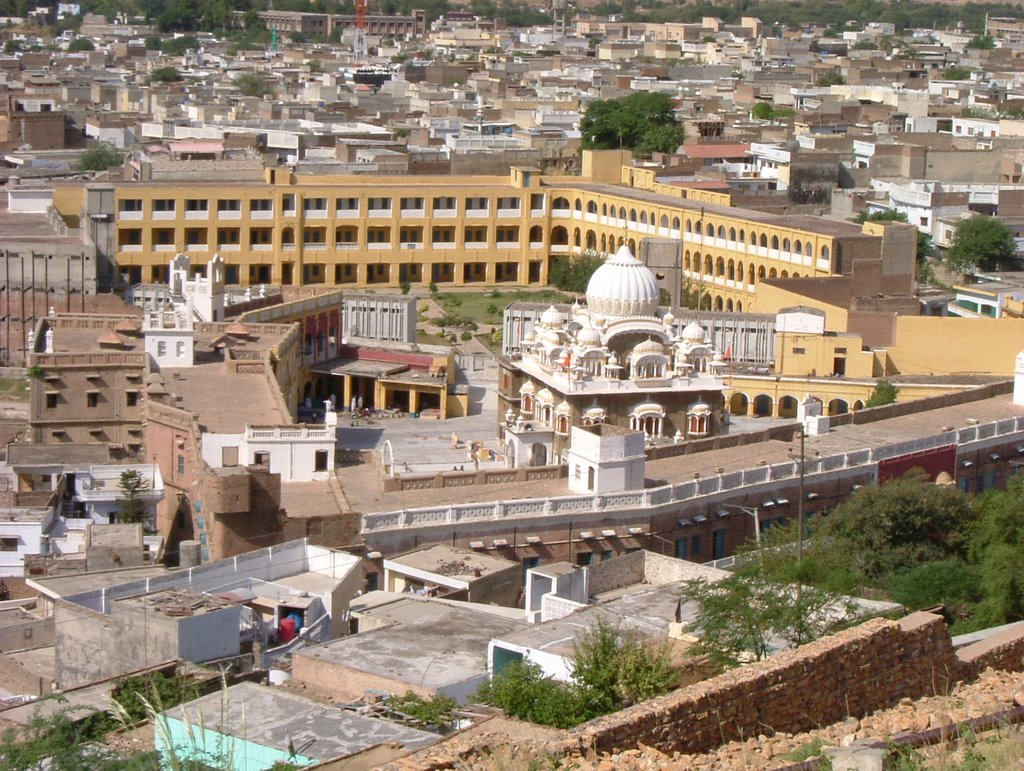
- The Gurdwara Panja Sahib in the city centre of Hasan Abdal

- Location within Punjab, Pakistan Location within Pakistan
- Coordinates: 33.819487°N 72.689026°E
- Country: Pakistan
- Province: Punjab
- District: Attock District
- Tehsil: Hasan Abdal Tehsil
- Elevation: 308 m (1,010 ft)

Population (2023)
  - Total: 69,529
- Time zone: UTC+5 (PST)
- Calling code: 057

Hasan Abdal (Punjabi and Urdu: حسَن ابدال) is a city in the Attock District of Punjab Province in Pakistan. Located 40 km northwest of the national capital, Islamabad, Hassan Abdal is the headquarters of Hasan Abdal Tehsil (sub-district).

Hasan Abdal is home of the Gurdwara Panja Sahib, a sacred site in Sikhism, and an important pilgrimage destination for Sikhs. The town also contains several monuments dating to the reign of Akbar, including the Mughal Gardens, Tomb of the Hakims, and the Tomb of Lala Rukh. Hasan Abdal is near to the city of Taxila – a UNESCO World Heritage Site famous for its ancient Gandharan ruins.

== Location ==
Hasan Abdal is located near boundary of northern Punjab with the province of Khyber Pakhtunkhwa, and was the location from which Mughal war expeditions were sent to the northwestern frontier. In modern times, Hasan Abdal lies at the intersection of the Karakoram Highway and the M1 Motorway. As part of the multibillion-dollar China-Pakistan Economic Corridor (CPEC), the Hasan Abdal area is planned to serve as the terminus for CPEC's Western Alignment, while the Hakla–Dera Ismail Khan Motorway will commence at Hasan Abdal.

== History ==
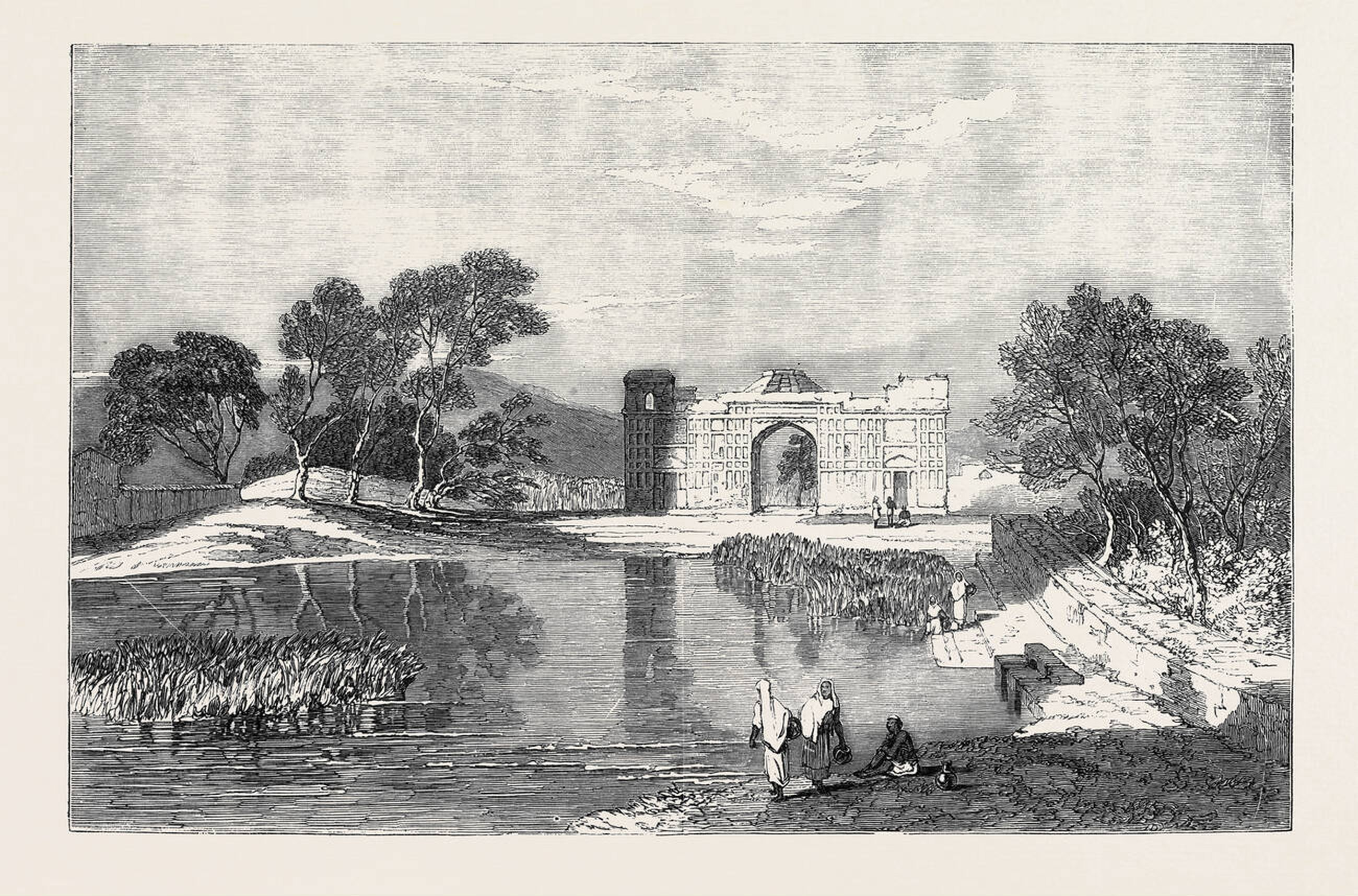
Lithograph of Hasan Abdal, after a sketch by G. T. Vigne, published by The Illustrated London News, 20 April 1850

The famous Chinese traveler Xuanzang who visited the place in the 7th century A.D. mentions the sacred spring of Elapatra about 70 li to the northwest of Taxila which has been identified as the spring at Gurdwara Panja Sahib. The town is mentioned in Ain-i-Akbari in the context that Shams al-Din built himself a vault there in which Hakim Abu’l Fath lies buried. Akbar’s visit to the town on his way back from Kashmir is also mentioned.

The origin of the name Hasan Abdal is attributed to two men, a Gujjar named Hasan and a Faqir named Abdal, according to the folk history. Abdal requested some milk from the Gujjar, who had many buffaloes. As Hasan did so freely, Abdal expressed his gratitude and asked what he could do for him, on which Hasan replied that they were much strained for water. Abdal then struck the neighbouring hills in two places from which sprang the two streams of Hasan Abdal.

In 1521, the founder of the Sikh faith, Guru Nanak, arrived in Hasan Abdal. A Gurdwara called Panja Sahib was built on the spot that he stayed at, containing a sacred rock that is believed to contain the hand print of Guru Nanak. Punja or panja (Punjabi: پنجہ (Shahmukhi); ਪੰਜਾ (Gurmukhi)):hand or paw. Twice a year, Sikh pilgrims visit this Gurdwara from all over the world.

William Finch who travelled through India between 1608 and 1611 described Hasan Abdal to be a "pleasant town with a small river and many fair tanks in which are many fishes with golden rings in their noses ...; the water so clear that you may see a penny in the bottom".

The town was the seat for Mughal warring expeditions to the empire's northwest frontier. The Mughal emperor Jahangir mentions the town in his Tuzk-e-Jahangiri by the name of Baba Hasan Abdal where he stayed for three days. He also praised the city in these words: "The celebrated place at this station is a spring which flows from the foot of a little hill, exceedingly clear, sweet and nice...". Hasan Abdal was visited by various Mughal kings on their way to Kashmir.

Raja Man Singh built the nearby Wah Gardens during the reign of Akbar. The terraced gardens were divided into four parts. Shah Jahan rested at the gardens on his four expeditions to Kabul. Emperor Aurangzeb stayed at the town for over a year beginning in 1674, in order to quell the "Afridi Revolt". The presence of Emperor Aurangzeb at the gardens convinced many local Pashtun tribes to abandon the rebellion, and join forces with the Mughals.

During British rule, the railway station at Hasan Abdal was built which linked areas to the north and west with the Punjab For areas where the railway lines ended, the tonga was available.

== Demographics ==
Population

Historical population
Year	Pop.	±%
1972	16,721	—
1981	27,132	+62.3%
1998	37,976	+40.0%
2017	63,218	+66.5%
2023	69,529	+10.0%

According to official 2023 census results, the population of Hasan Abdal city is 69,529.

Religions

Religion in Hasan Abdal (2023)
1. Islam (97.5%)
2. Christianity (1.31%)
3. Sikhism (1.04%)
4. Others (0.19%)

The partition of India and Pakistan significantly changed the demographic composition of Pakistani cities with the vast majority of Hindus and Sikhs having to leave Pakistan and vice versa for Muslims in India. The 2023 Pakistani Census however showed that while still overwhelmingly Muslim at 97.5%, there is now a re-established Sikh community in the holy city their founder Guru Nanak once stayed at. The city of Hasan Abdal has small Christian and Sikh communities comprising 1.31% (numbering 907) and 1.04% (722 people) of the population, respectively.

=== Language ===
Urban population of Hasan Abdal Tehsil
1. Punjabi (59.1%)
2. Pashto (22.1%)
3. Hindko (8.45%)
4. Urdu (6.88%)
5. Sindhi (1.25%)
6. Others (2.23%)

in the 2023 census Hasan Abdal City exhibited a predominantly Punjabi speaking population, forming 59.13% of the residents. Pashto is the second-largest language group at 22.06%, followed by Hindko at 8.45%, Urdu at 6.88% and Sindhi at 1.25%, with an additional 2.23% constituted by other languages (Mostly Kashmiri and Kohistani).

== Infrastructure ==
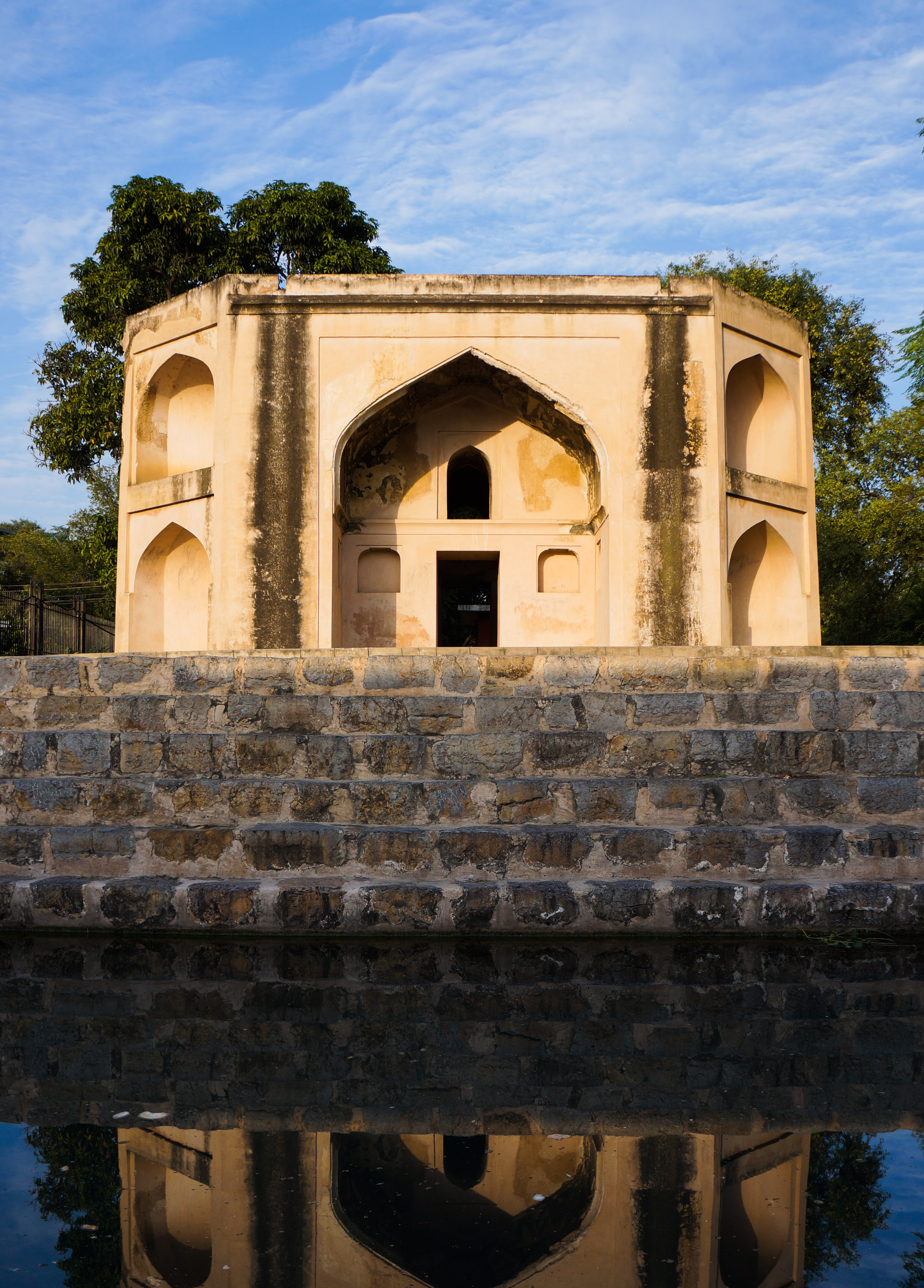
The Tomb of the Hakims was built in 1589.

Hasan Abdal is located near the intersection of the Karakoram Highway heading northwest, and the M1 Motorway that connects Hassan Abdal to points northwest and southeast. As part of the multibillion-dollar China–Pakistan Economic Corridor (CPEC), the Karakoram Highway will be rebuilt, while the Hasan Abdal area will serve as the terminus for CPEC's Western Alignment. From the nearby village of Hakla, the Hakla–Dera Ismail Khan Motorway will run southwest out of the city and link Hassan Abdal to Dera Ismail Khan in Khyber Pakhtunkhwa province.

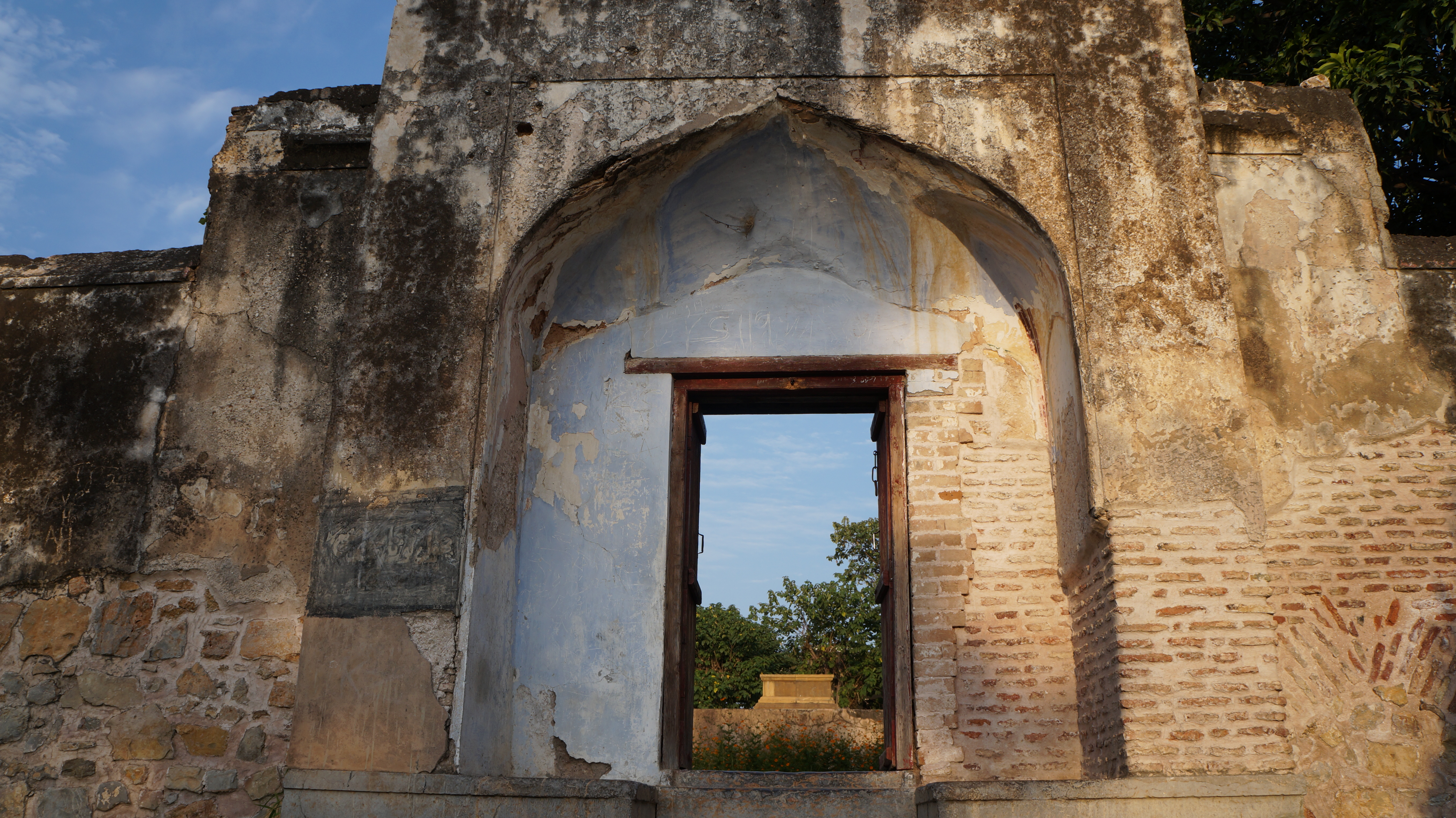
The Tomb of Lala Rukh was built in the 17th century, and is traditionally believed to be the tomb of a daughter of the Emperor Akbar.

== Education ==
The city has several state-owned primary schools, a high school each for boys and girls, a higher secondary school each for boys and girls and a degree college for women. There are a number of privately run schools to make up for the shortfall of the state-owned ones. These include Trends School, and Presentation Convent High School, the latter of which was established in 1956.

=== Cadet College, Hasan Abdal ===
Cadet College Hasan Abdal is the first Cadet College in Pakistan and was established by the government of Punjab at the initiative of General Muhammad Ayub Khan, the then Commander-in-Chief of the Pakistan Army, originally to serve as a feeder institution to the Services Academies. For this purpose, Military Wings were started in 1952 in Government College, Sahiwal, and Islamia College, Peshawar. On the completion of buildings at the present location, the Military Wings were shifted to Hasan Abdal and the Cadet College started functioning as Punjab Cadet College in April 1954. In 1960, the government constituted a Board of Governors to exercise administrative control over the college. Hugh Catchpole (1907-1997) was the founder Principal of the College. According to his will, he was buried at Cadet College Hasan Abdal. He served at Cadet College Hasan Abdal for 4 years, then he joined PAF Public School Sargodha as the founder principal.

The college is located on the Rawalpindi/Peshawar road about 48 km from Rawalpindi/Islamabad, in natural surroundings near the junction of the National Highway and Grand Trunk Road.

== Environment ==
Surrounded by the fresh-water springs with crystal clear water and Loquat orchards, the city used to be an idyllic place till recent past. Its beauty, as mentioned in the earliest accounts, has somehow survived the ill-planning that has resulted in an exponential increase in its population.

== See also ==
- Grand Trunk Road
- Sikhism in Pakistan
