= Balvand Rai =

Rabab player and author of the Guru Granth Sahib

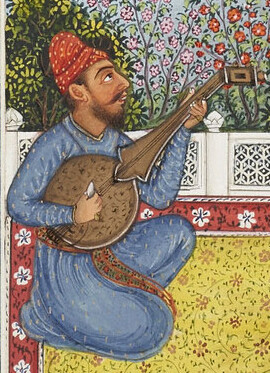
- Detail of a rababi (possibly Bhai Balvand Rai) from a painting of Guru Arjan (the fifth Sikh Guru) listening to music, from a series of paintings of the first nine Sikh gurus, circa 1800–1840

Personal life
- Born: Balvand Doom
- Died: Lahore, Punjab
- Known for: Rababi; Guru Granth Sahib hymns
- Relatives: Satta Doom (brother)

Religious life
- Religion: Sikhism

Balvand Rai (fl. late 16th to early 17th century) also spelt as Balwand and Rai Balvand, was a poet mystic and rabab player in the court of Guru Arjan.

== Biography ==
He was born a Muslim belonging to the Doom-Mirasi community who embraced Sikh thought during the time of Guru Arjan. Alternative sources describe him as being born into a Bhatt family. He had a brother named Satta Doom. Other sources do not ascribe a brotherly blood relation between Balvand Rai and Satta Doom. Another narrative is that he began playing hymns for the Sikh guru's congregation during the guruship of Guru Angad, a relationship with Sikhs that would continue up til the guruship of Guru Arjan. His three hymns are included in the Guru Granth Sahib in Ramkali measure at Amritsar. According to Sikh lore, him and his brother, Satta, became too arrogant and abandoned the guru after a disagreement over funds they requested from the Sikhs. Eventually, they would return to serving the Sikh guru after falling ill and realizing their errors, where they were pardoned for their earlier transgressions. He co-composed this Ballad of Ramkali with his brother, Bhai Satta Doom, who was a drummer (player of the jori), which includes a total of six hymns. They were motivated to compose these hymns as a means of apology for leaving the service of the guru. The compositions he co-composed with his brother Satta can be found on pages 966–968 of the Guru Granth Sahib under the title of Ramkali ki Vaar Rai Balwand tatta Satte doom akhi. The Sikh guru was greatly impressed by the work and conduct of Balvand, therefore he gave the title of "Rai", which is usually reserved for Brahmin scholars alone. He is said to have died in Lahore during the time of Guru Hargobind (1595–1644) and was buried on the bank of the River Ravi.

== See also ==
- Bhai Mardana
- Babak (Rababi)
- Rababi
- Sikh music
