= Gurdwara Panja Sahib =

Gurdwara in Hasan Abdal, Pakistan

- گردوارا پنجہ صاحب ਗੁਰਦੁਆਰਾ ਪੰਜਾ ਸਾਹਿਬ
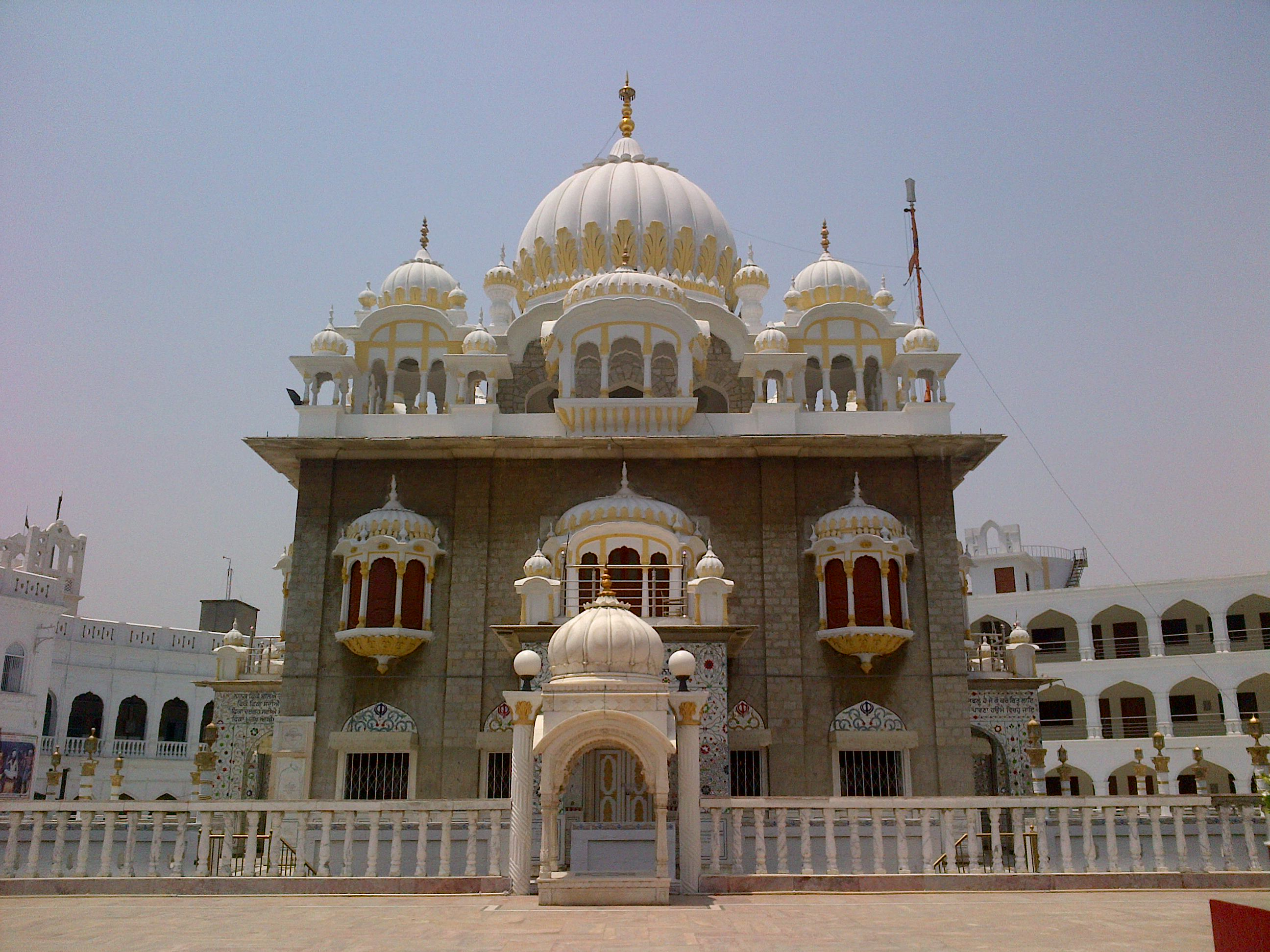

- Location within Punjab, Pakistan Location within Pakistan

General information
- Architectural style: Sikh architecture
- Location: Hasan Abdal, Attock district, Punjab, Pakistan
- Coordinates: 33°49′15″N 72°41′23″E

Gurdwara Panja Sahib (Note: Shahmukhi Punjabi: گردوارا پنجہ صاحب; Gurmukhi Punjabi: ਗੁਰਦੁਆਰਾ ਪੰਜਾ ਸਾਹਿਬ; Urdu: گردوارہ پنجہ صاحب) is a gurdwara located in Hasan Abdal, Punjab, Pakistan. It is one of the most important sites for the Sikhs, as the handprint of Guru Nanak—the founder of Sikhism—is believed to be imprinted on a boulder at the gurdwara. It is managed by the Pakistan Sikh Gurdwara Parbandhak Committee under the federal government of Pakistan.

== History ==
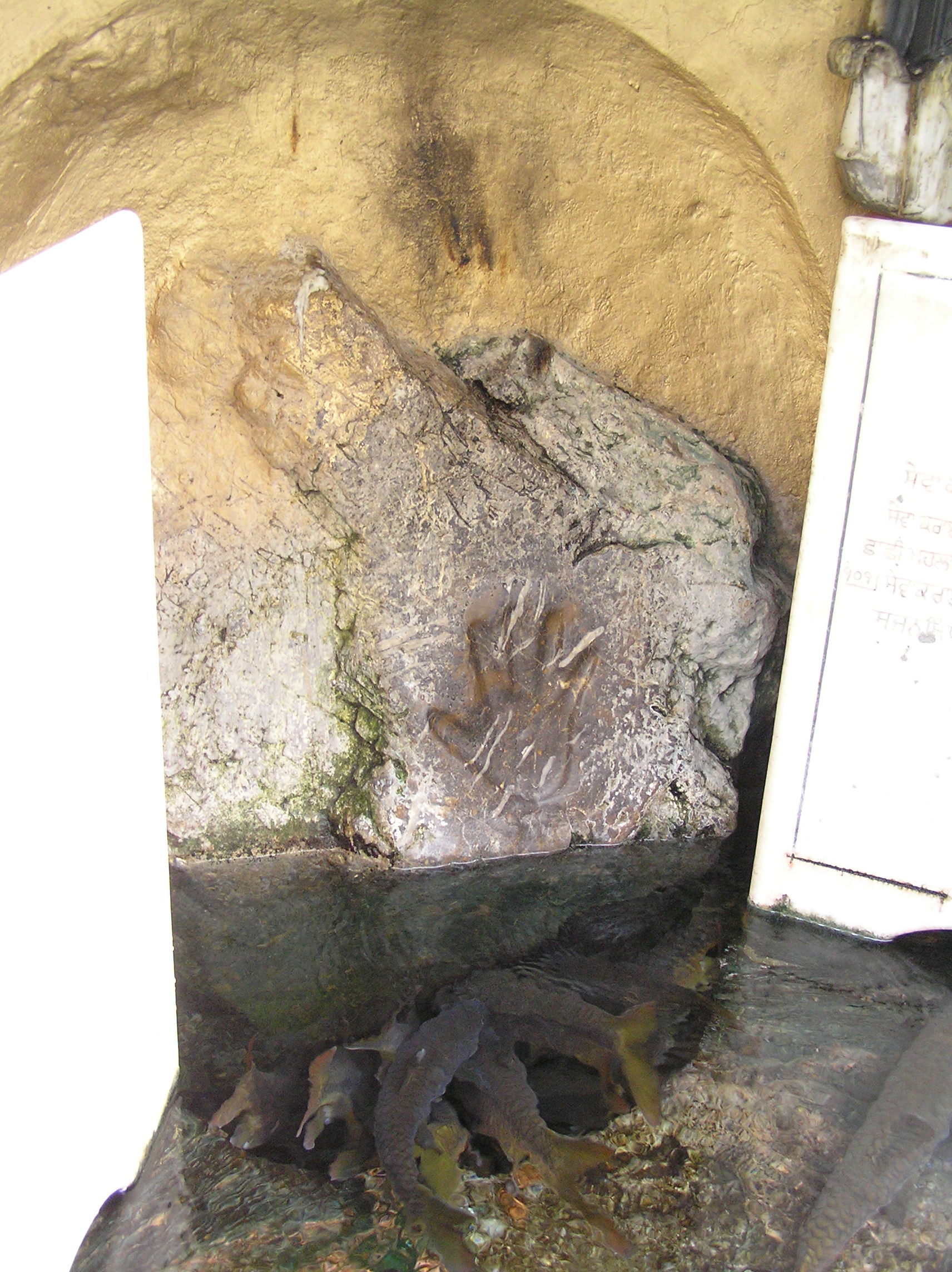
Handprint on the boulder which is believed by Sikhs to be that of Guru Nanak.

The famous Chinese traveler Xuanzang who visited the place in the 7th century CE mentions the sacred spring of Elapatra about 70 li to the northwest of Taxila which has been identified as the spring at Gurdwara Panja Sahib. Guru Nanak along with Bhai Mardana reached Hasan Abdal in Baisakh Samwat 1578 BK, corresponding to the summer of 1521 CE, when according to Sikh legend, Guru Nanak's handprint was imprinted onto a boulder. The Gurdwara was named Panja Sahib by Hari Singh Nalwa, the most famous general of the Sikh Empire. He is credited with having built the first gurdwara at the site.

The older structure of Gurdwara Panja Sahib had murals depicting Guru Nanak decorating its walls.

== Legend ==
Under a shady cool tree, Guru Nanak and Bhai Mardana started reciting Kirtan and their devotees gathered around. This annoyed a local saint, Shah Wali Qandhari.

According to Sikh legend, Bhai Mardana was sent three times to Shah Wali Qandhari by Guru Nanak so that he would provide him with some water to quench his thirst. Wali Qandhari refused his request and was rude to him. In spite of this, Mardana still very politely stuck to his demand. The Wali remarked : "Why don't you ask your Master whom you serve?"

Mardana went back to the Guru in a miserable state and said "Oh lord! I prefer death to thirst but will not approach Wali the egoist."

The Guru replied "Oh Bhai Mardana ji! Repeat the Name of God, the Almighty; and drink the water to your heart's content."

The Guru put aside a big rock lying nearby and a pure fountain of water sprang up and began to flow endlessly. Bhai Mardana quenched his thirst and felt grateful to the Guru.

On the other hand, the fountain of Shah Wali Qandhari dried up. On witnessing this, the Wali in his rage threw a part of a mountain towards the Guru from the top of the hill. The Guru stopped the hurled rock. Clear, fresh spring water gushes out from somewhere behind the rock and spills over into a very large pool. An imprint of a right hand was carved on the rock while it was built in the Mughal style by Maharaja Ranjit Singh (1780-1839).

== Gallery ==
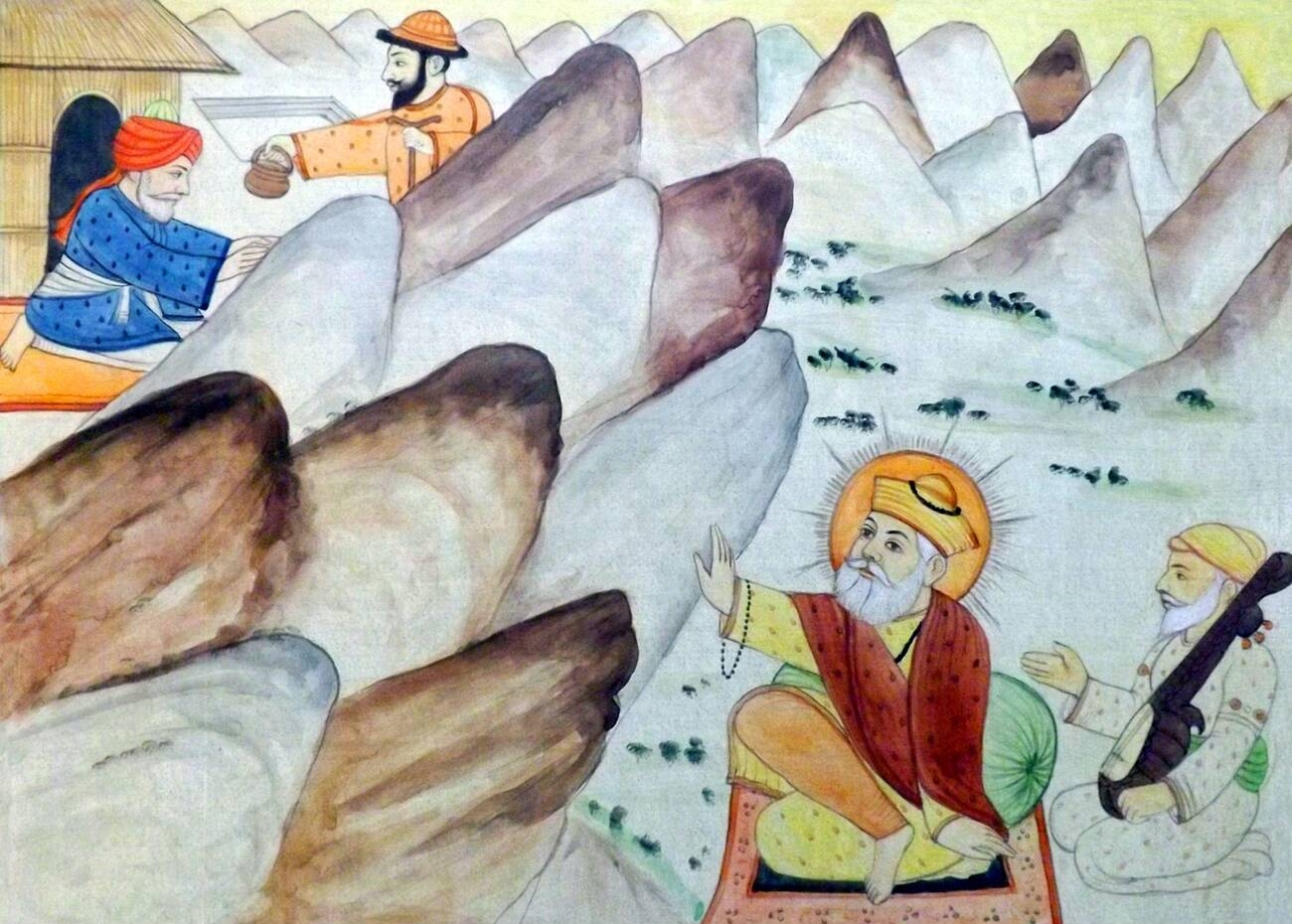
Guru Nanak stops the boulder from falling with his hand, 19th century artwork.

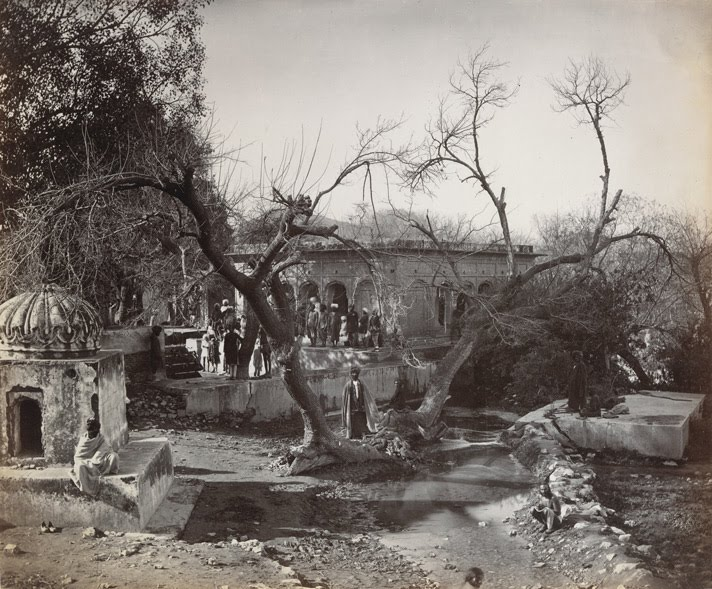
Photograph of ruins at Hasan Abdal, Punjab, with Gurdwara Panja Sahib in background, ca.1880

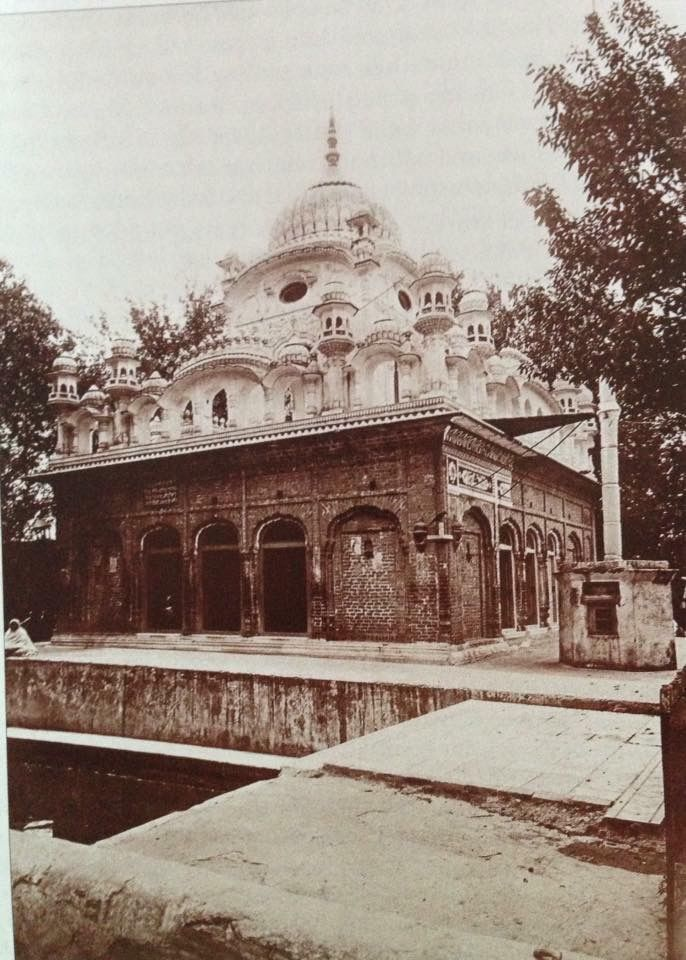
Shrine of Gurdwara Panja Sahib constructed by Hari Singh Nalwa, photographed ca.1913

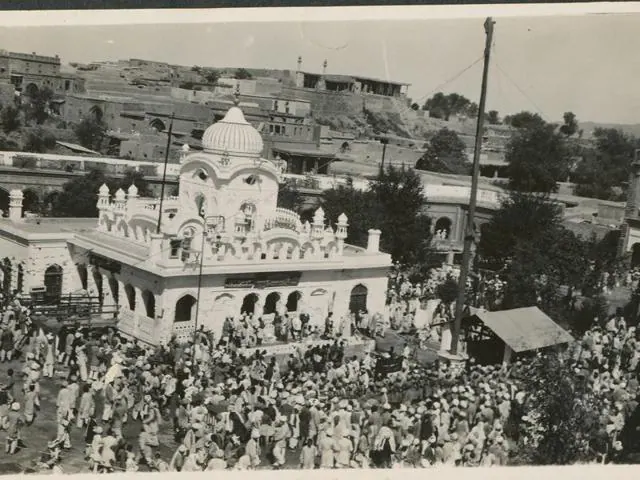
Gurdwara Panja Sahib, Hasan Abdal in April 1932.

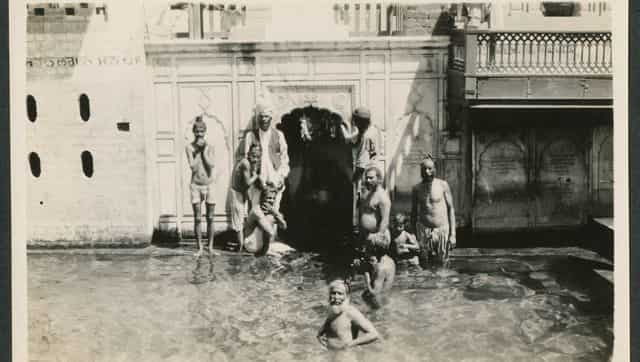
Sarovar of Gurdwara Panja Sahib, Hasan Abdal in April 1932.

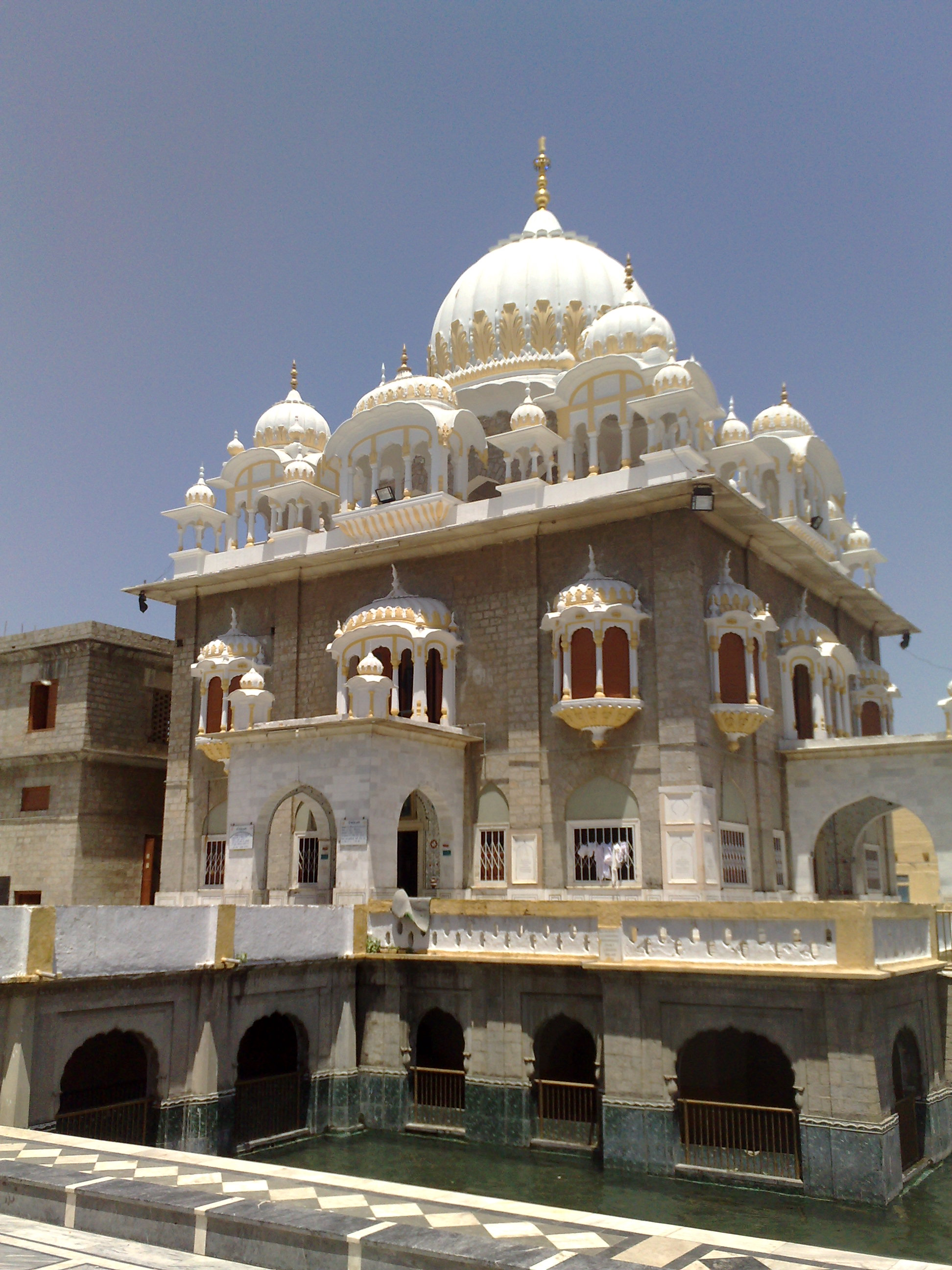

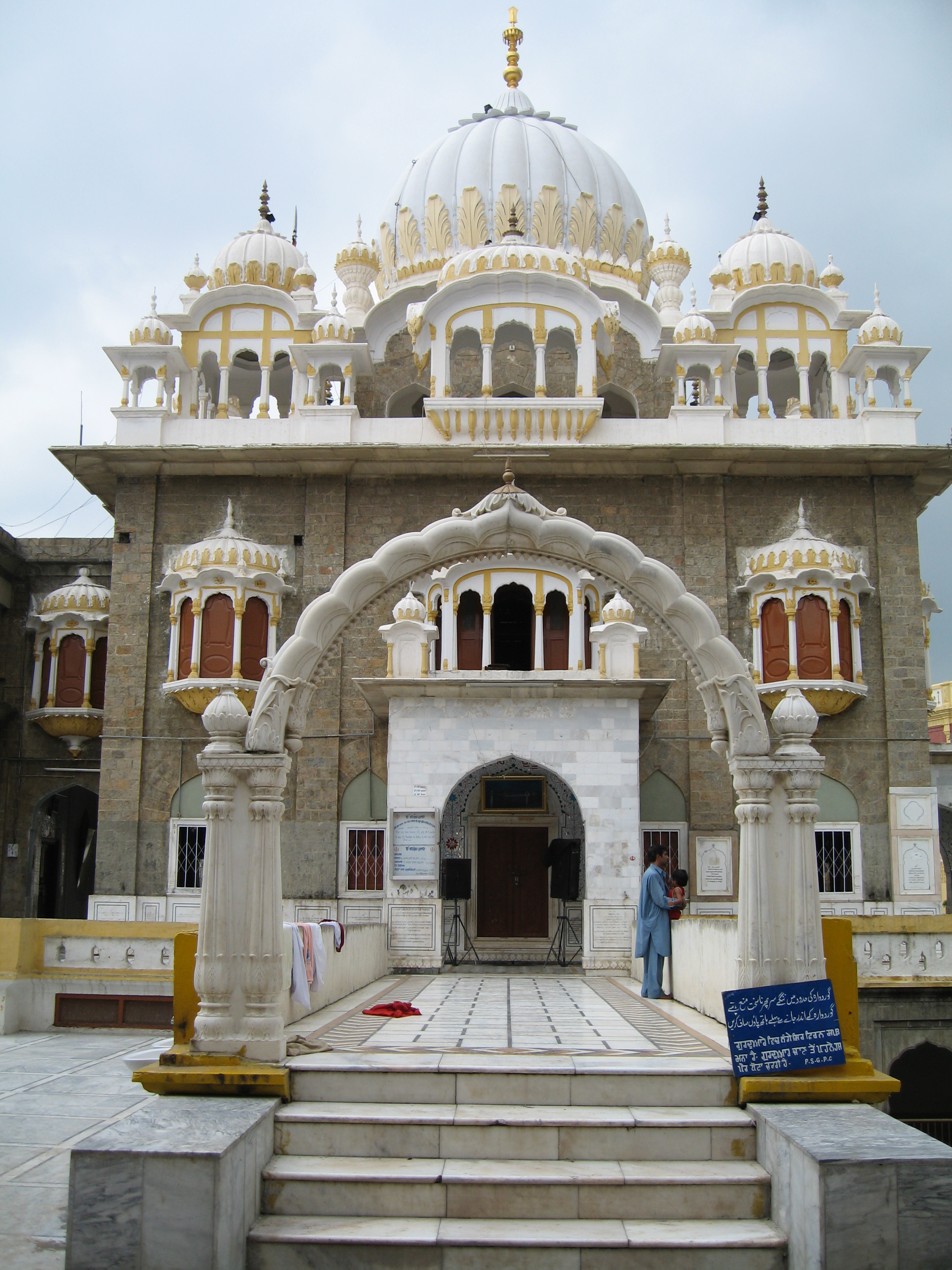

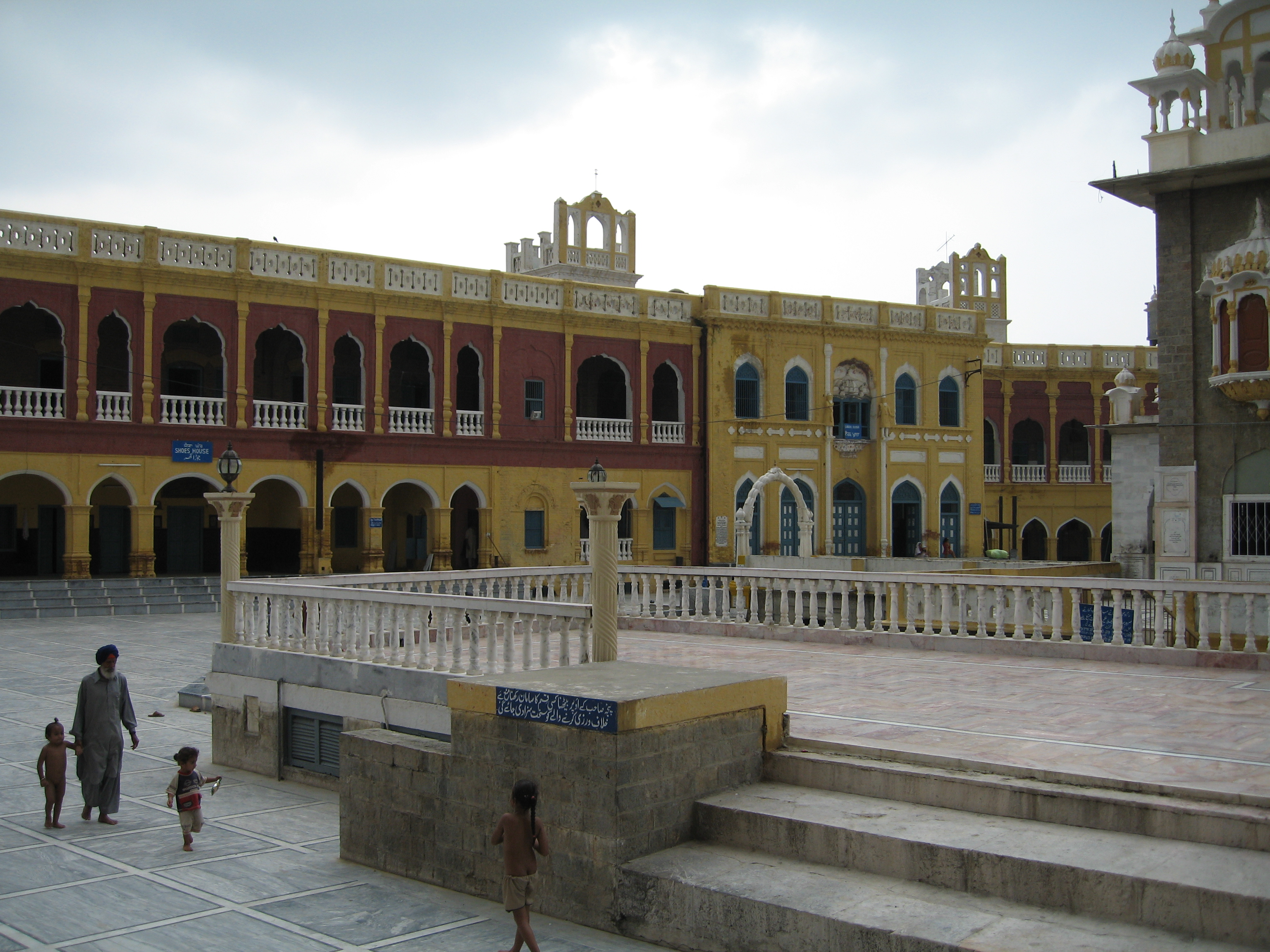

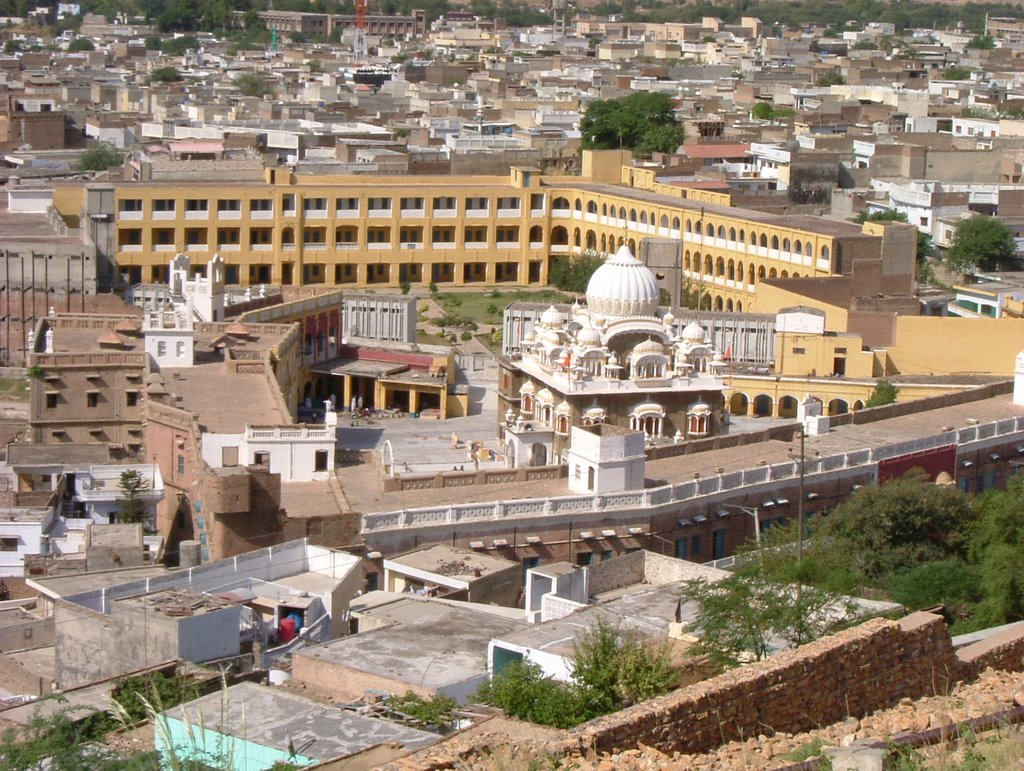

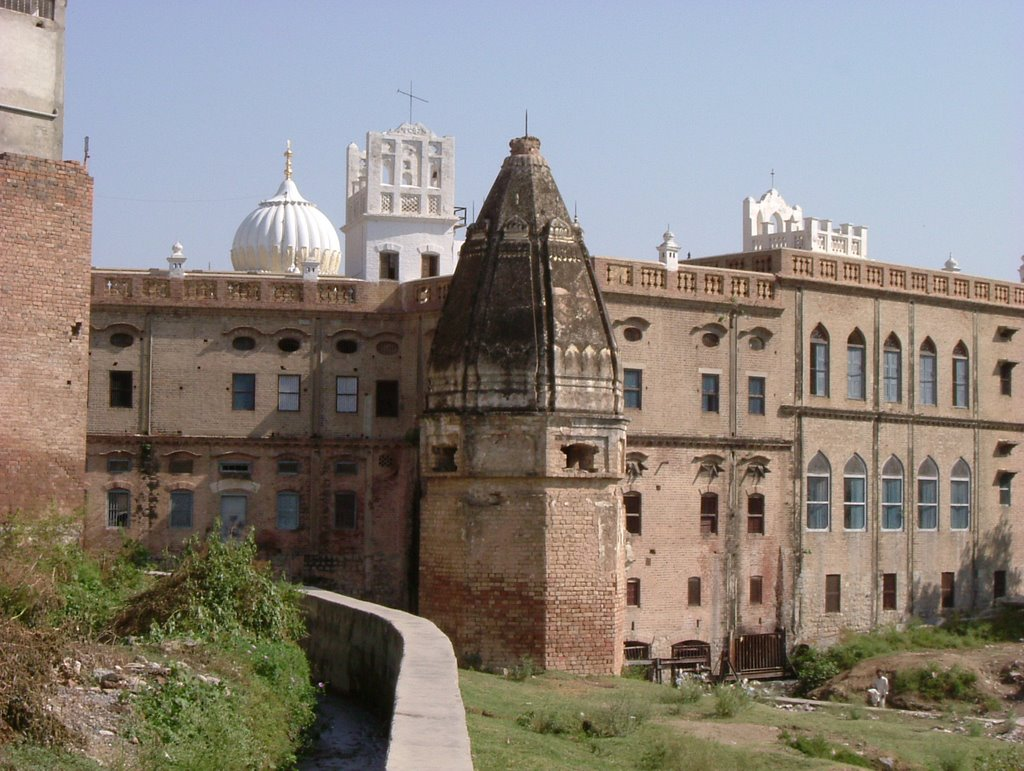
The rear side of the gurdwara features an old Hindu temple.

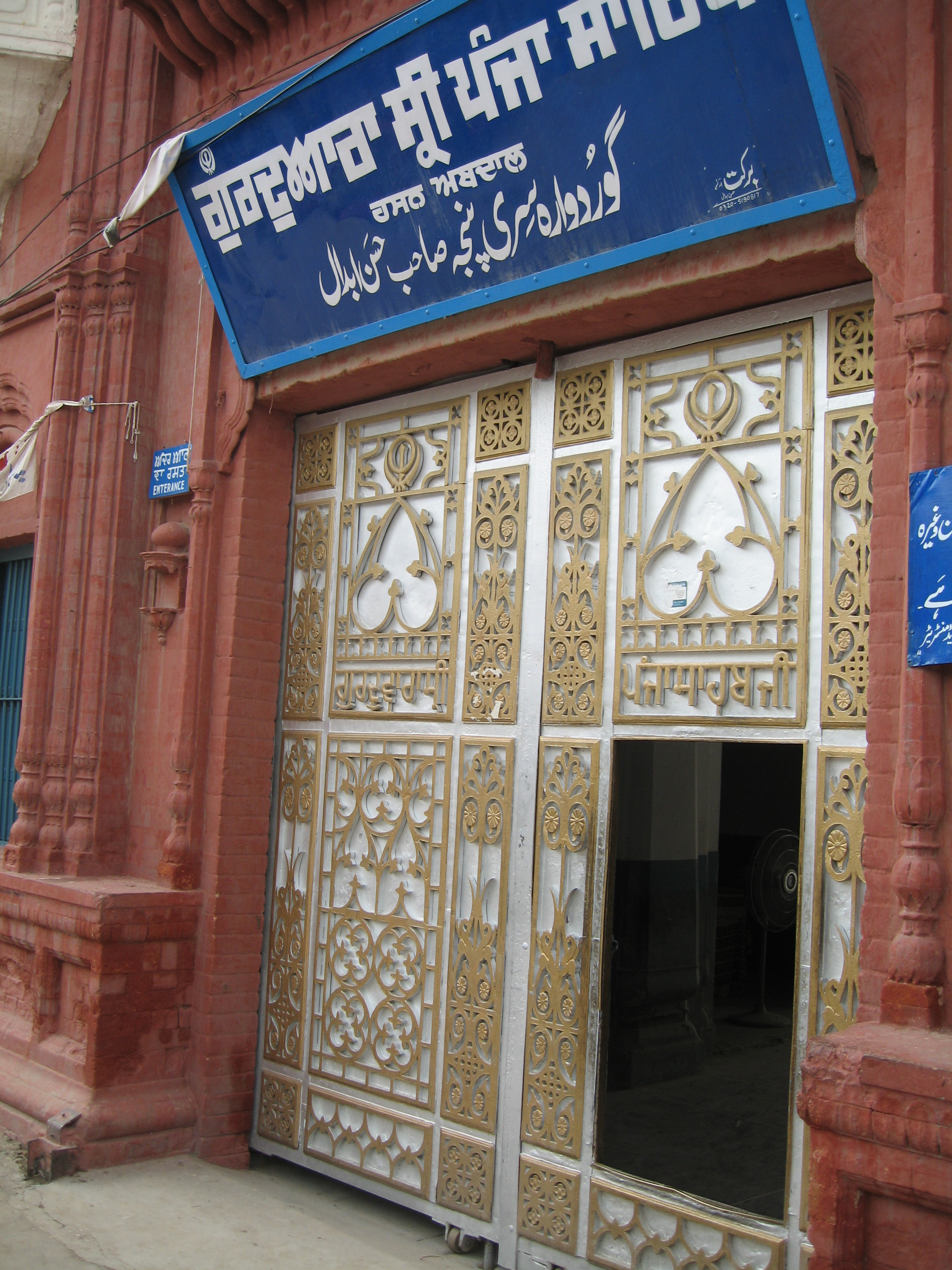
Entrance to Panja Sahib Gurdwara in Hasan Abda

Fish in spring underneath hand print at Panja Sahib Gurdwara in Hasan Abdal
