= Esraj =

String instrument from the Indian subcontinent

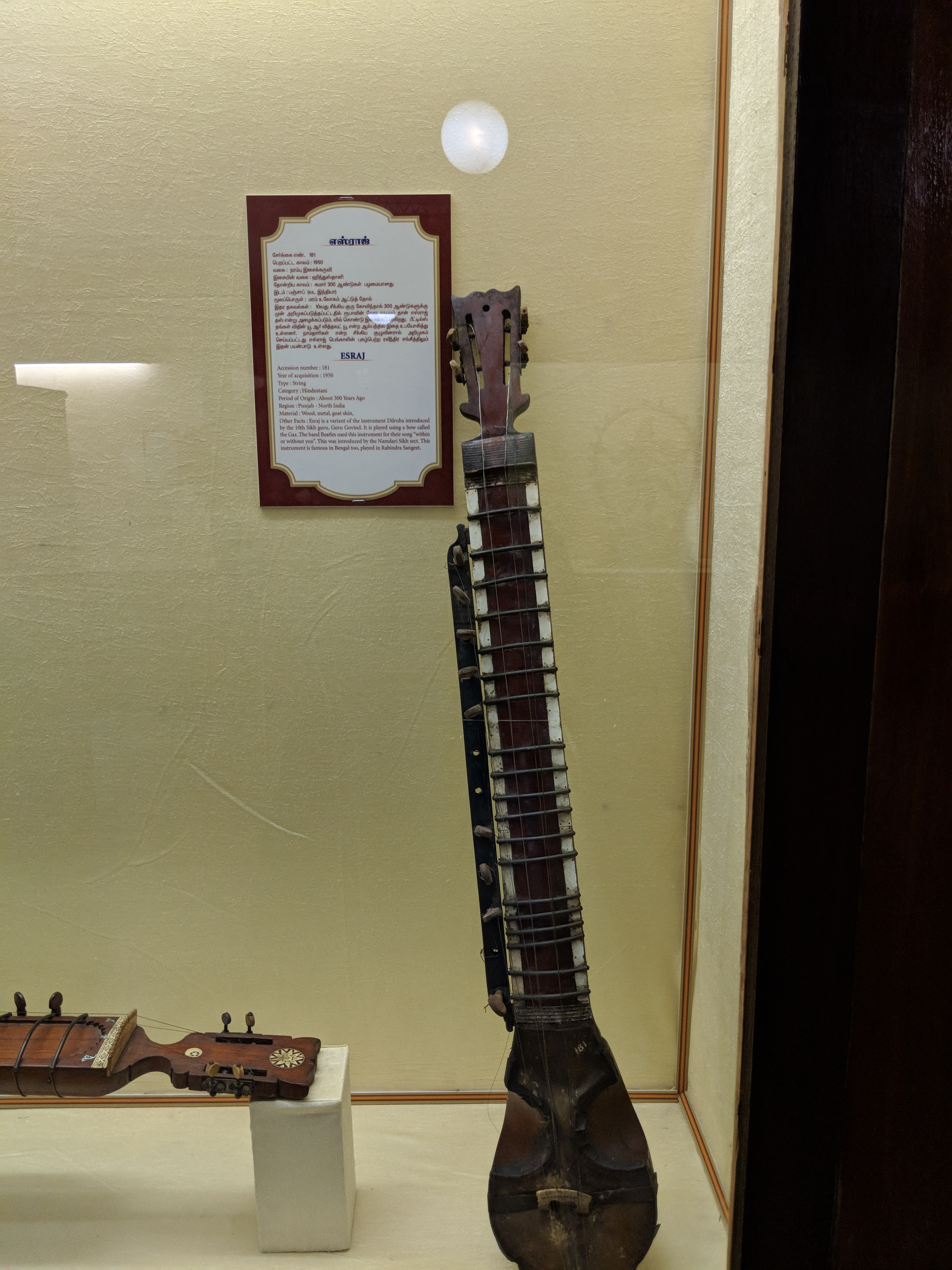
- Esraj on display in the Iyal Isai Museum Exhibition in Government Museum, Chennai

String instrument
- Other names: Israj
- Classification: Bowed string instrument
- Developed: 17th century

Playing range
- 3-4 Octaves

Related instruments
- Sarinda; Sarangi; Taus; Dilruba; Tarshanai or Tar Shehnai

The esraj or esraaj (from the Punjabi: ਇਸਰਾਜ Shahmukhi: اسراج Bengali: এস্রাজ) is a stringed instrument found in two forms throughout South Asia. It is a relatively recent instrument, being only about 300 years old. It is found in Pakistan and North India, primarily Punjab, where it is used in Sikh music, Bangladesh and West Bengal, India where it is used in Rabindra Sangeet and Classical Music. The esraj is a modern variant of the dilruba, differing slightly in structure.

The dilruba and its variant, the esraj, had been declining in popularity for many decades. By the 1980s, the instrument was nearly extinct. However, with the rising influence of the "Gurmat Sangeet" movement in an effort to revive the traditional instrumentation of Sikh Kirtan, the instrument has been once again attracting attention. In Bengal, Rabindranath Tagore made this instrument mandatory for all the students of the Sangeet Bhavan (Music Academy) in Visva-Bharati University (otherwise known as Shantiniketan). Because of this, Esraj is considered the main accompanying instrument for traditional Rabindra Sangeet.

== History ==
Esraj is the modern variant of the dilruba. The dilruba was created some 300 years ago by the 10th Sikh guru, Guru Gobind Singh, who based it on the much older, and heavier, Taus. This made it more convenient for the Khalsa, the Sikh army, to carry the instrument on horseback.

According to the folklore, the esraj was created by Ishwari Raj, a musician who lived in Gayadam.

== Construction styles ==
The dilruba and its variant, the esraj, have a similar yet distinct construction style, with each having a medium-sized sitar-like neck with 20 heavy metal frets. This neck carries a long wooden rack of 12–15 sympathetic strings, known as the taraf strings, and 2-3 jawari strings. By the jawari strings, one can give emphasis on the vadi, samvadi, and nayeshwar notes, but jawari strings may not always be present. Jawari helps in producing a more piercing sound. The dilruba has more sympathetic strings, and a differently shaped body than the esraj. The esraj has four main strings while the dilruba has 6 both which are bowed. All strings are metal. The soundboard is a stretched piece of goatskin similar to what is found on a sarangi. Occasionally, the instrument has a gourd affixed to the top for balance or for tone enhancement.

There are two variants of esraj played in Shantiniketan; the traditional variety, and the modern model developed by Ranadhir Roy. This version is longer, with a wider fingerboard, and with an additional, diminutive "jawari" bridge near the peghead for the three drone strings. The newer model has a larger body, which is perforated in back, plus it has an open-backed, removable "tumba" behind the peghead. An instrument maker of Kolkata, named Dulal Patra worked to develop the newer model of esraj as per Roy's instructions.

== Playing ==
The esraj can be rested between the knees while the player kneels, or more commonly rested on the knee of the player while sitting, or also on the floor just in front of the player, with the neck leaning on the left shoulder. Only the esraj players of Shantiniketan keep the esraj erect by resting it on their lap. It is played with a bow (known as a "gaz"), with the other hand moving along the strings over the frets. The player may slide the note up or down to achieve the portamento, or meend. The esraj can imitate the "gamak" of vocal music and by using the middle finger one can create "krintan". Roy used sitarbaz, sarodbaz and esrajbaz in his compositions.

== Notable figures ==
- Asian Music Circle, used in George Harrison's "Within You Without You"
- Pandit Shiv Dayal Batish
- S. N. Bose
- Roshan Lal Nagrath
- Ashesh Bandyopadhyay
- Ranadhir Roy

== See also ==
- Taus (instrument)
- Sarangi
- Sitar
