= Taus (instrument) =

North Indian bowed string instrument

Taus or mayuri veena
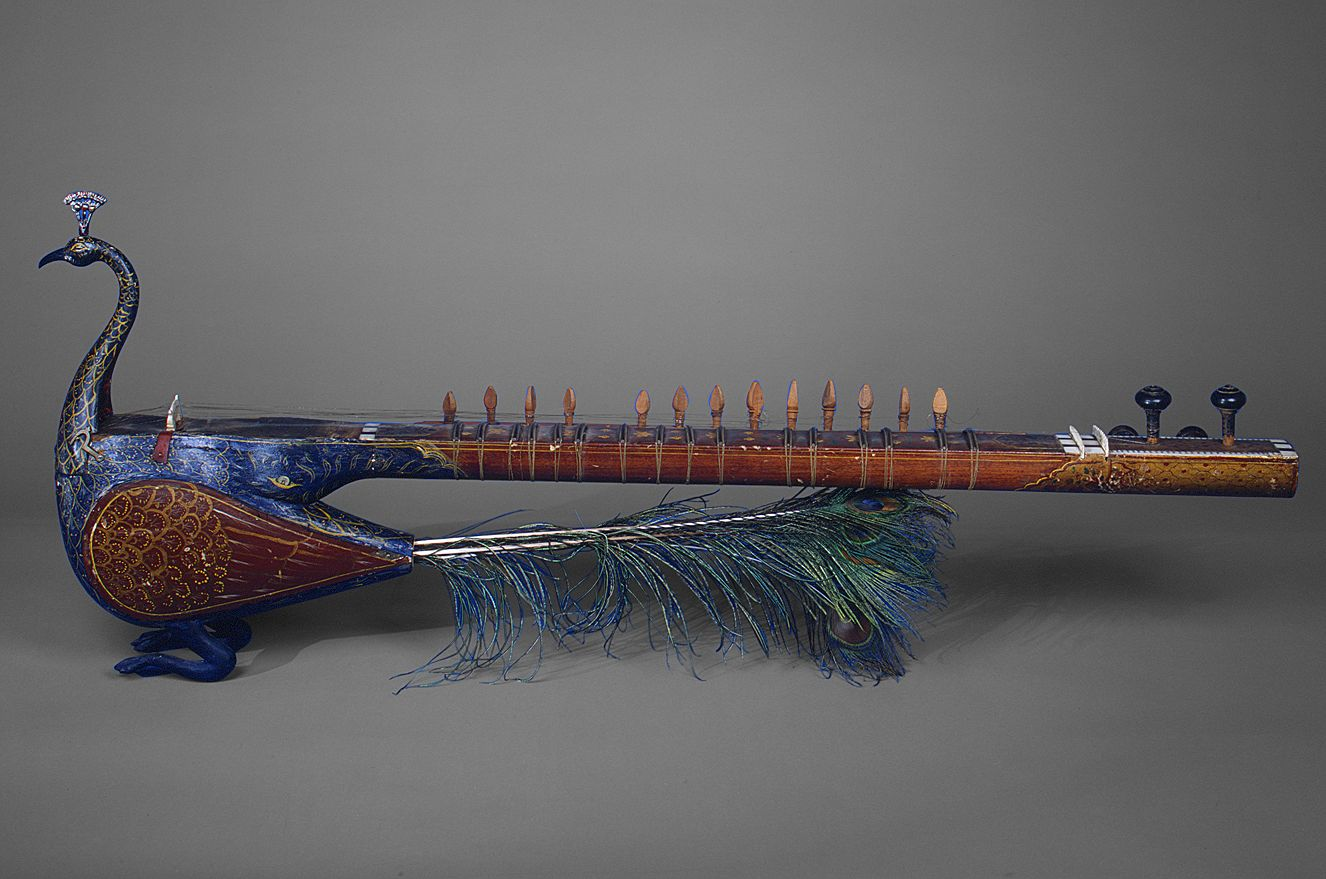
- Taus or mayuri veena
- Other names: Mayuri veena
- Classification: Bowed string instrument

Related instruments
- Sarinda; Sarangi; Dilruba/esraj

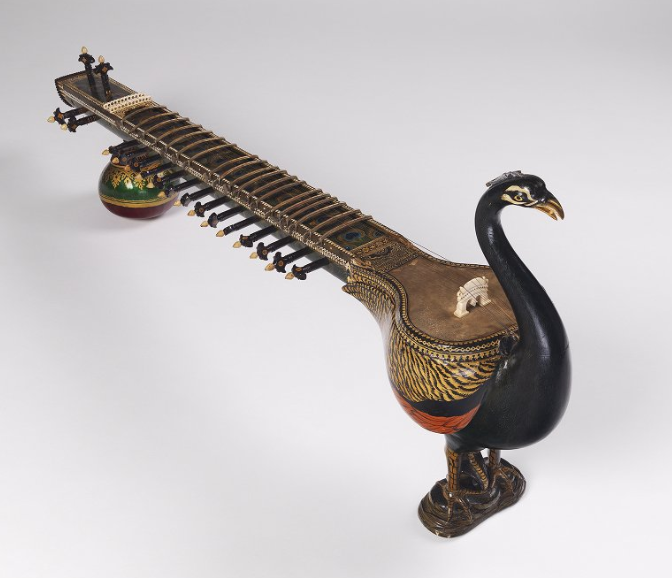
Tā’ūs or Mayūrī (`Peacock vina'), St Cecilia's Hall

The taus, also known as the mayuri veena, is a bowed string instrument from North India. It is a form of veena used in North India with a peacock-shaped resonator called a mayuri, and is played with the neck of the instrument on bow. References to the mayuri veena have been found in Malavikagnimitra, written by the Sanskrit poet Kalidasa between the 4th to 5th centuries CE. The name taus is a Persian translation of the word 'peacock', or mayura in Sanskrit.

== Origin story ==
Bhai Avtar Singh, a well-known taus player and ragi who practiced the historic style of kirtan, tells the story of the invention of the Taus in the following quote:

"The taus was conceived by and designed by the 6th Guru, Guru Hargobind Ji. [...] The Guru and his Sikhs were singing outdoors under a tree enjoying God and nature. As was the old tradition, they were playing some string instruments. After a while, the musicians took a rest, and they leaned their instruments up against a tree. A peacock waddled into the group and he cried in the wailing sound that belongs only to the peacock. All of the stringed instruments resonated with the sound of the peacock cry, and the strings started humming. The sound was so ethereal and Guru Sahib liked that sound so much that he said, 'Let us design an instrument that sounds like this-- a combination of the resonation of all the string instruments and the plaintive cry of the peacock.' And that's how the taus was invented under the supervision of Guru Hargobind Ji."

== Relation to other instruments ==
The dilruba and the esraj are heavily influenced by the taus, which pre-dates them in origin.

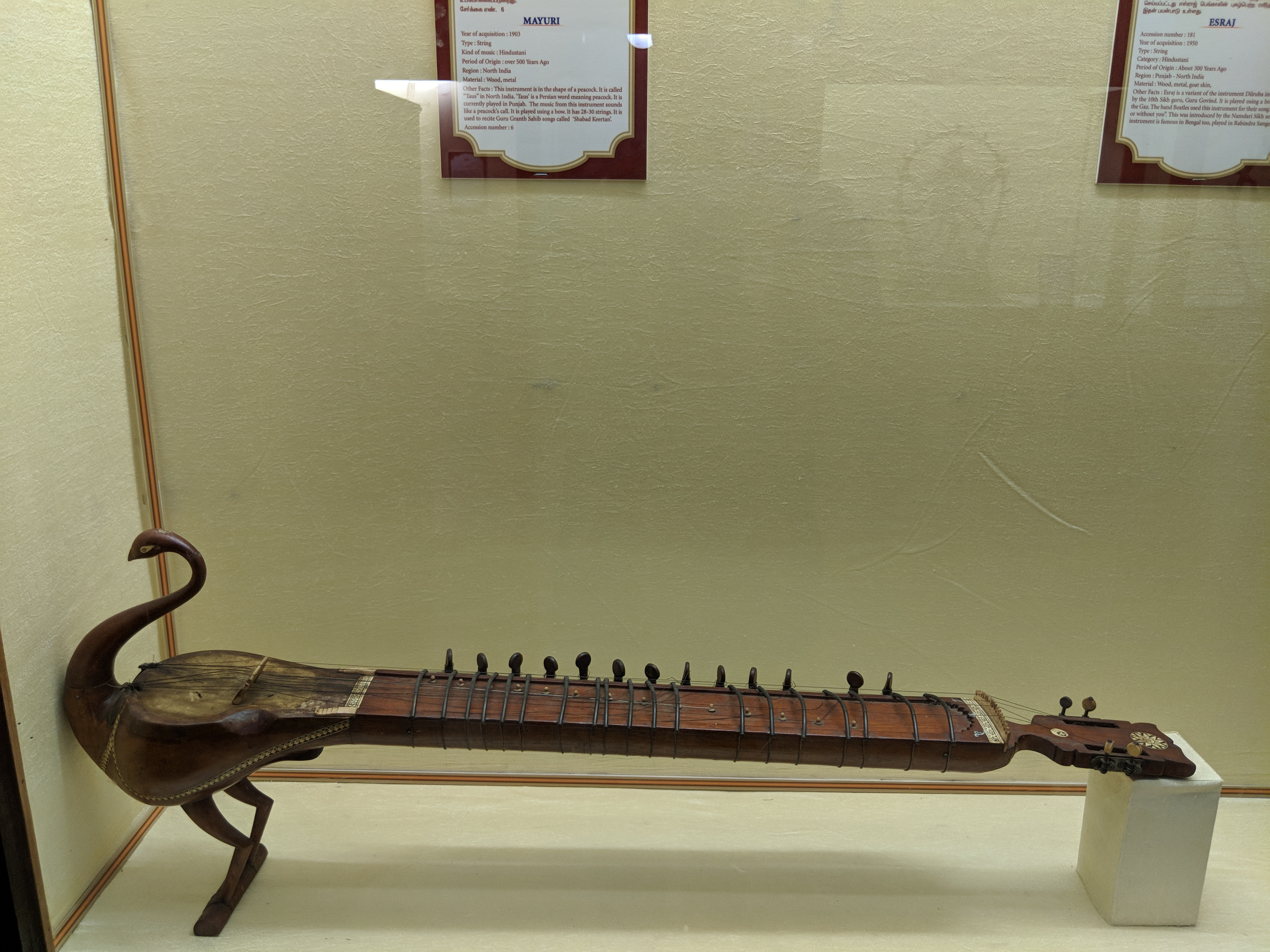
Mayuri, 1903.

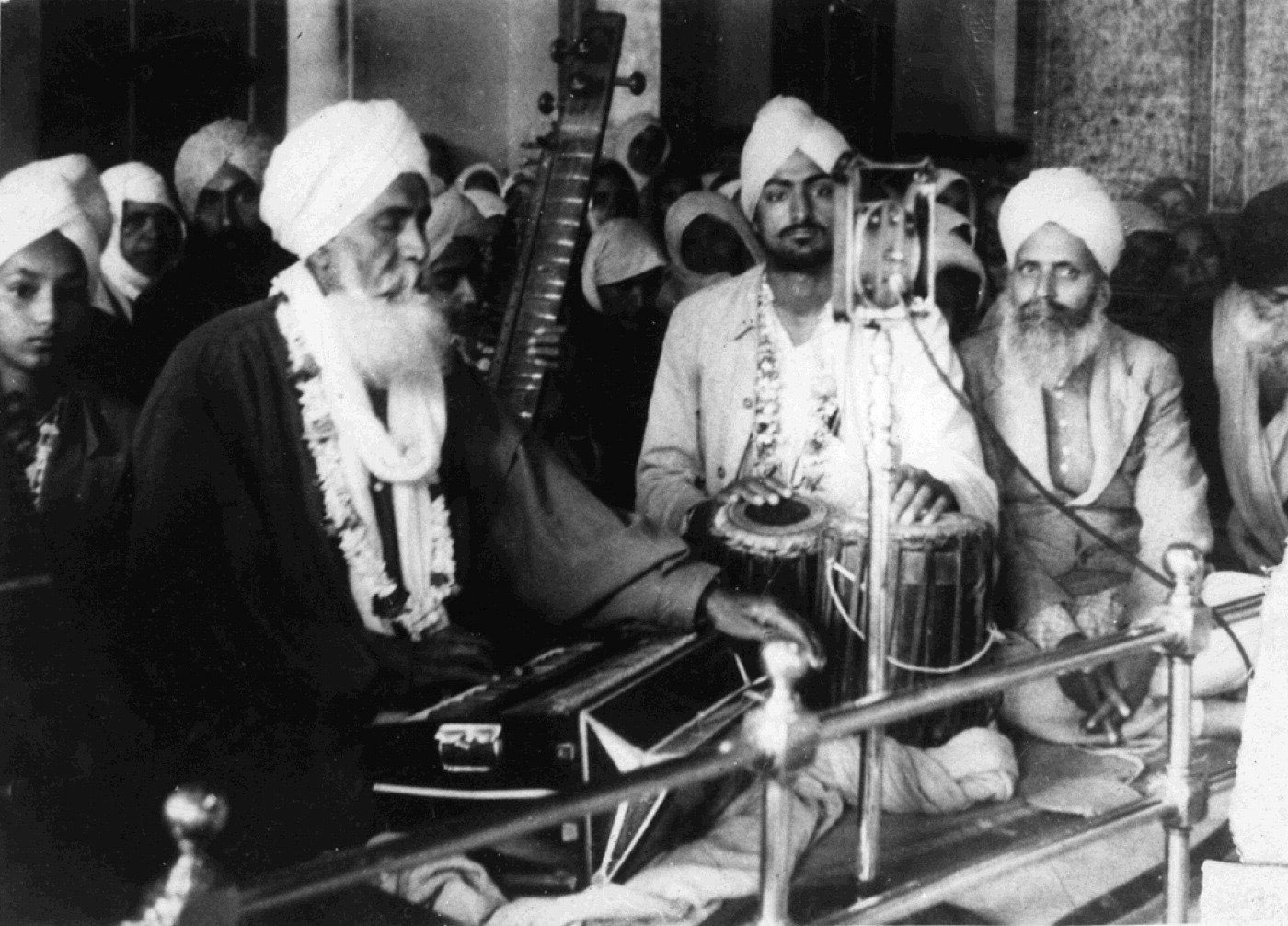
Photograph of Bhai Jawala Singh Ragi playing accordion (vaaja), Bhai Gurcharn Singh on Jori, and Bhai Avtar Singh on Taus at Gurdwara Dehra Sahib, Lahore, ca.1935

The traditional story of the dilruba's creation indicates that the 10th Sikh Guru, Guru Gobind Singh, had it created as a lightweight alternative to the taus, so the Sikh army could carry it on horseback.

The esraj is a modern variant of the dilruba.

== Construction ==
The main identifying characteristic of the taus is the peacock shape of the body. It is played with a bow made of horse hair. There are four metal strings above the frets, which are the main strings. Only the leftmost string is played with the bow.

There are a number of sympathetic strings between the frets and the neck, which provide additional resonance. These are tuned according to the raag being played, in a similar manner to the sitar.

== In the media ==
Avtar Singh played the taus on the BBC Radio 4 'Today' programme on 18 September 2024 to mark the addition of 5 Indian string instruments into the UK's eight-grade music exam system.
