= Dilruba =

Sikh bowed musical instrument

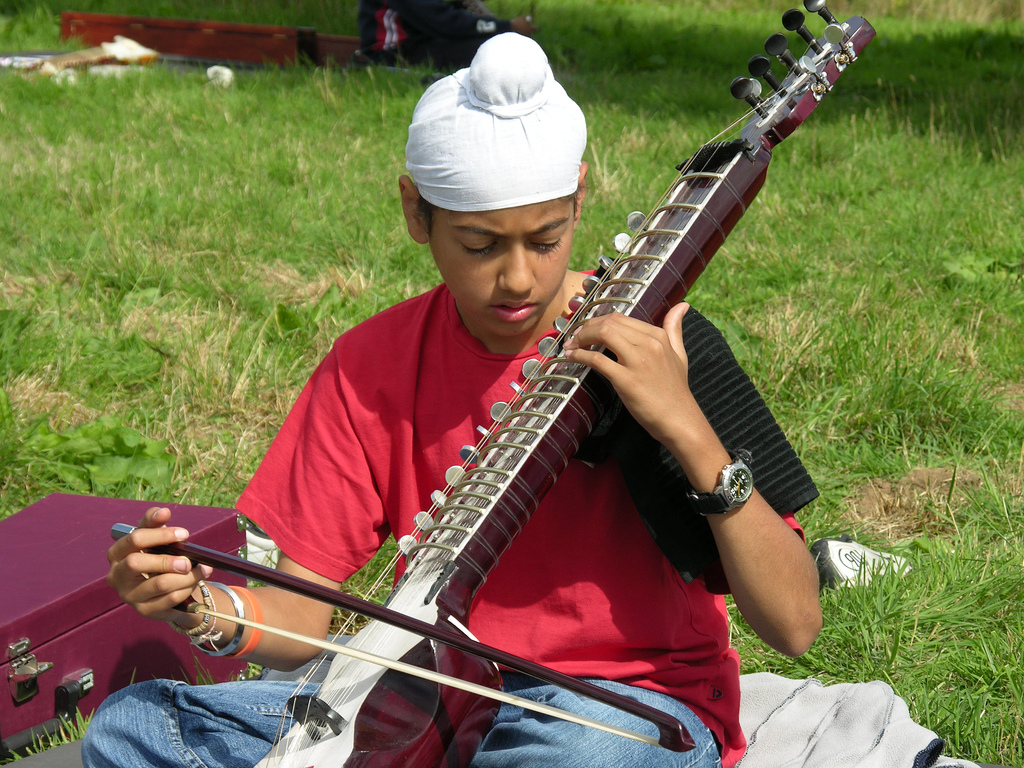
- A Sikh boy playing the Dilruba

String instrument
- Other names: Dilrupa
- Classification: Bowed string instrument
- Developed: India

The dilruba (also spelled dilrupa) is a bowed musical instrument originating in India. It is a type of bowed sitar that's slightly larger than an esraj and has a larger, square resonance box like a sarangi. The dilruba holds particular importance in Sikh history.

It became more widely known outside India in the 1960s through use in songs by Western artists, such as the Beatles during their psychedelic phase (most notably in the song "Within You Without You").

== Etymology ==
The name of the instrument derives from the Persian دلربا/दिलरुबा (dilrubā), literally meaning "that which ravishes or steals the heart."

== History ==
Although versions of the dilruba have existed as far back as the third and fourth centuries, the version played by Sikhs is believed to have been remastered around 300 years ago by the 10th Sikh Guru, Guru Gobind Singh, who based it on the much older and much heavier taus. His innovations made it more convenient for the Sikh army (the khalsa) to carry the instrument on horseback.

There is some doubt in the research community about the truth of the traditional origin story described above. Some traditional kirtan bearers, such as Bhai Avtar Singh Raagi, have clarified the history of the dilruba's creation being tied to the patronage of Maharaja Bhupinder Singh and created by Mahant Gajja Singh.

After the introduction of the harmonium to the Indian Subcontinent by the British Raj, the dilruba fell out of use due to its comparatively steeper learning curve. In more recent times, it has had a resurgence, accompanying ragis in the Harmandir Sahib (Golden Temple) since 2006, and becoming more commonly taught within India and around the world.

== Construction ==
The construction of a dilruba is very similar to the sitar with some components of the sarangi. Like the sitar, it has a long neck with about 20 moveable metal frets. It has 4 metal main strings and more than 20 sympathetic strings. Of the main strings, only the leftmost string is played with the bow. The resonator of the instrument, at the bottom, is a hollowed out gourd or carved wood covered with a stretched piece of goatskin, in the style of the sarangi.

Some dilrubas may have a gourd attached to the top of the neck for balance or tone adjustment.

To play a dilruba, the musician sits and rests the bottom of the instrument in front of them or in their lap, with the neck resting on the musician's left shoulder. The left hand uses the frets as a guide to modify the pitch of the leftmost string. The bow is held in the right hand.

To produce the portamento or meend that is characteristic of Indian music, the musician moves the left hand up and down the string, rather than stretching the string across the fret like a sitar.
