= Sarinda (instrument) =

Musical instrument

Saranda
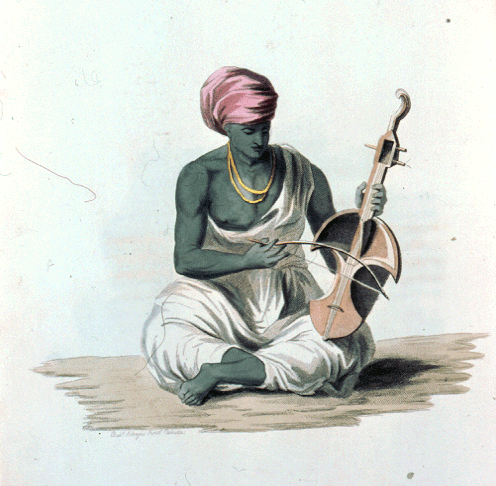
- Classification: Bowed string instrument

Related instruments
- Sarangi

Sarinda (Bengali:সরিণ্ডা, Assamese:চৰিণ্ডা, Punjabi:ਸਰਿੰਦ, Urdu:سرندا; also spelled saranda) is a traditional bowed string musical instrument originating from the Indian subcontinent. It is crafted from a single block of wood with a hollow resonator. The instrument has three main playing strings and with a total of thirty-six sympathetic strings. These strings cascade down a slender waist and traverse an oval-shaped resonating chamber, which is partially adorned with animal skin. It is played while sitting on the ground in a vertical orientation. The sarinda is an integral part of the folk music traditions of Bangladesh, India, and parts of Pakistan. It is similar to the sarangi, lute, and the fiddle. It is the sole accompaniment for a soloist or group folk singera.

== History ==
The sarinda’s precise origins are not documented. It appears in folk traditions of the Bengal region and eastern India and shares basic construction features with simpler tribal fiddles such as the dhodro banam used by the Santal people.

The sarinda developed distinctive regional variations over time. In Punjab, the instrument was incorporated into Sikh devotional music (kirtan) by Guru Arjan Dev (1563–1606), the fifth Sikh Guru, marking its formal entry into Sikh religious performance. This adaptation represents the sarinda's transition from a predominantly folk and tribal instrument to one embedded in structured religious and classical music traditions.

Over centuries, the sarinda spread in Bengal and neighboring regions in Eastern Indian Subcontinent, where it became a significant accompaniment for Baul, Fakir, and Murshidi musical traditions in Bangladesh and West Bengal. It also became prominent among tribal groups in Assam and Tripura and was historically widespread among Pashtun, Baloch, and Sindhi communities in present-day Pakistan.

== Regional variations & usage ==
- In Bangladesh, the sarinda is central to Baul, Fakir, Murshidi, and Marfati music traditions. It is also used in folk events such as nouka baich (boat races), kavigan (poetry contests), and rural theatre.
- In West Bengal, similar traditions persist among the Bauls and Rajbongshi communities, where a version called Sarinja is used.
- In Assam and Tripura, tribal versions (Serja or Serenja) are played by the Bodo and Tripuri communities. The Tripura sarinda is decorated with bird-shaped scrolls on the pegbox.
- In Punjab, the sarinda was historically used in Sikh kirtan music and Punjabi folk traditions.
- In Rajasthan, the folk artists use the sarinda in their traditional music and dance.
- In Pakistan, particularly among Pashtun and Baloch communities, the sarinda was once a core folk instrument, though it is now nearly extinct there.
- In Nepal, the Nepali sarangi is similar to the sarinda.

== Legal Recognition ==
In 2022, the sarinda was awarded a Geographical indication (GI) certificate.

== See also ==
- Sarangi - a more common relative of the sarinda.
- Sarangi (Nepali) - a simpler version of the sarangi, played in Nepal and Sikkim.
- Surando - ancient Sindhi musical instrument.
