= Energy policy of Pakistan =

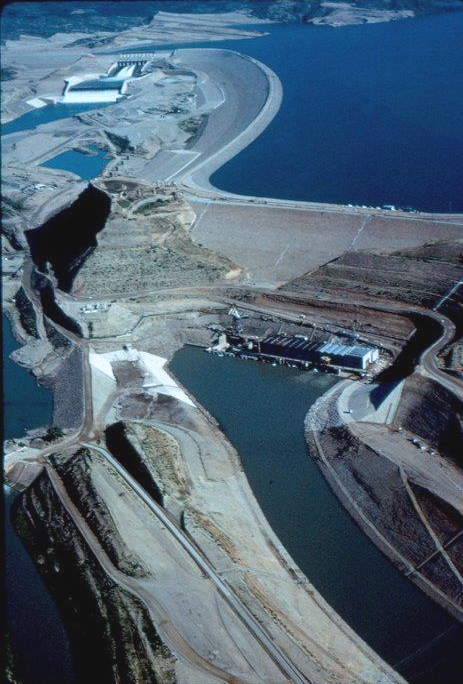
Mangla Dam

Development of carbon dioxide emissions

The energy policy of Pakistan is formulated and determined by the federal, provincial, and local institutional entities in Pakistan, which address the issues of energy production, distribution, and consumption of energy, such as gas mileage and petroleum standards. Energy policy requires the proper legislation, international treaties, subsidies and incentives to investment, guidelines for energy conservation, taxation and other public policy techniques.

Several mandates and proposals have been called over the years to overlook the energy conservation, such as neon signs were banned and the official weekend was extended from one to two days in an attempt to conserve electricity (Gillani, 2010) and reducing the electricity load used by industrial units by 25% during peak hours (Aziz, 2007), but no comprehensive long-term energy strategies were implemented. Since 1999, many legislative provisions were adopted for energy conservation including the seeking energy from various renewable energy sources. There is also an intense criticism about the unequal distribution of energy, the irresponsible usage of energy sources, and the country's new plan which is aimed to raise country's dependence on imported oil for power generation to 50% by 2030. After much public criticism, the long-term energy security policy was announced in 2013 through the introduction of equal cutting-edge energy transmission network, minimising financial losses across the energy system and aligning the ministries involved in the energy sector as well as improving the governance of energy sources.

Studies and policy implementation recommended by AEDB, the water ministry (as policy enforcer), the NEPRA regulates the energy sources network as well as determining the financial prices of the usage of energy. Government-specific energy-efficiency incentive programs also play a significant role in the overall energy policy of Pakistan. As of 2013, Prime Minister Nawaz Sharif announced a determined and aggressive energy policy to meet the energy challenges and energy management.

== Energy authorities and institutions ==
- Government of Pakistan
  - Ministry of Energy
    - Private Power & Infrastructure Board
    - Alternative Energy Development Board
- Industrial energy sector
  - Electricity sector in Pakistan
- Energy and power regulatory authorities
  - Water and Power Development Authority
  - National Electric Power Regulatory Authority
- Energy corporations
  - Electricity and energy corporations in Pakistan
- Karachi Electric

== History ==
In the 1960s, a large civilian energy input and infrastructure was built by the Pakistan military, with the financial funds provided by various countries and international monetary sources. In the 1960s, much of the energy was produced by the hydroelectric dams and thermal power stations. In the 1970s, Pakistan's energy consumption expanded to nuclear power sources with the establishment and commissioning of first nuclear power station in Karachi. In the 1980s, the dependence on nuclear sources further grew and the military continued engineering and building the nuclear power infrastructure.

In 1994, Prime Minister Benazir Bhutto of Pakistan Peoples Party (PPP) launched the country's first ever and largest energy conservation program to produce 13,000 MW and issued 70 memorandums of understanding (MOUs) and letters of intent (LOIs) to independent power producers (IPPs). This 1994 energy policy brought a decisive shift in Pakistan's diverse energy sources. In 1994, out of the total installed capacity of 11000 MW, ~60% of energy was produced from the hydroelectric power sources while nearly ~40% was produced from the thermal and nuclear sources. According to the economic statistics provided by economist, Sartaj Aziz, this mix was reversed from 60:40 to 30:70 in favour of thermal capacity based on imported fuel. Every year, this ratio went down further to 20:80 in winter months as hydropower generation was reduced due to lower water flows in the rivers.

Controversially, the energy policy depended less on renewable energy sources and dependence on imported oil increased that created a permanent fault in country's energy conservation system. By 1995, only 27 IPPs were able to generate ~6,335 MW of electricity. By 1998, the ratio was stabilised by the policies enforced by Prime Minister Nawaz Sharif. In 2001, the military government led by President Pervez Musharraf and Prime Minister Shaukat Aziz, while contributing to the growth of domestic demand for electricity through large-scale provision of bank loans for the purchase of air-conditioners and home appliances (share of domestic energy consumption had jumped to 46% of the total by 2008), did not add any new capacity to the energy system. In 2012 Pakistan's first wind power installation came online at the FFCEL Wind Energy Project in Jhimpir.

== Policy overview ==
=== Energy policy: 2008–10 ===
In 2005, Prime Minister Shaukat Aziz announced the long-term energy security program which was aimed to the development of the power infrastructure from all energy sources. This policy relied on privatising the energy sector by international mega energy corporations. Controversially, this program was aimed to raise dependence on imported oil from the Arab countries for power generation to be increased by 50.1% by 2013.

In 2006, Aziz held a conversation with the officials of the Saudi Ministry of Petroleum and invited Ali Al-Naimi to invest in country's energy sector. In 2007, Aziz allocated ₨. 12.5 billion for power production-related projects which remained unused. In his last policy statement, Aziz further called for banning the Neon lights, Neon signs, and to close the market places by 9 pm; such policy enforcement was harshly resisted by the left-wing parties, such as Pakistan Peoples Party, Communist Party and the labour unions.

=== Energy policy: 2010–13 ===
After the general elections held in 2008, the mismanagement and weak policies led to an intense repetitive cycle of loadshedding in the country. Responding to a massive demonstration against the loadshedding and the growing power shortages in the country, Prime Minister Yousaf Gilani announced the "energy policy" on 22 April 2010.

The policy was announced after Gilani had held a three-day national energy conference in Islamabad with energy experts that discussed the causes of the power crisis in Pakistan and possible steps to relieve it. With immediate effect, the gaseous Neon lights and the signs were banned and the official weekend was extended from one to two days in an attempt to conserve electricity. Under this policy, several attempts were made by the Gilani government to privatise the energy sector. Devised by the Finance Minister Abdul Hafeez Shaikh, the programme failed to resolve electricity shortage, which private energy companies failed to maintain and upgrade despite being part of their contract. After much criticism and public demonstration in 2012, the PPP government decided to nationalised the energy sector and issued clear directives to regulate the energy corporations to produce the power generations.

=== Energy policy: 2013–18 ===
Musadik Masood Malik was appointed federal minister, Water and Power of the Pakistan Government in May, 2013. Within two months, he was replaced by Abid Sher Ali who served in the role until the ministry was abolished in September, 2017. In its place a Ministry of Energy was created. Awais Leghari served as the first energy minister of the country until the end of the government's tenure.

The 2010 amendment to Pakistan's Constitution (para. 3) empowered each province to formulate the policy framework for the development of public and private sector power generation. This has led to the formation of dedicated provincial departments and empowered public sector companies specialized in renewables to foster and execute power projects through public, private and public–private partnership modes using indigenous power resources.

This tenure's energy policy was aimed at aggressively building power generation capacity through early-harvest projects in CPEC. A total of 10,973 MW of power was added by the government during its tenure, mostly via private sector investments. In terms of public sector projects conducted by provincial governments in view of the 2010 amendment, KPK government led with the addition of 1,670 MW to the national grid. It was followed by Sindh and Punjab governments which contributed 935 MW and 580 MW respectively. Balochistan government did not inaugurate any public sector power project during its tenure.

However, despite the massive addition of power to the national grid, glaring issues existed in the power sector. There was no viable overhaul done to the electricity transport infrastructure which lead to episodes of plant tripping and extended blackouts during the summer months. Furthermore, there was still a wide demand and supply gap during high temperature months which led to periodic, planned load-shedding. Finally, the issue of circular debt was still attached to the power sector and reached a record high of Rs. 922 billion in March, 2018.

=== Strengthen regional cooperation: 2019–present ===
At the same time as the construction of the China-Pakistan Economic Corridor, Pakistan has strengthened energy cooperation with Russia and Central Asian countries and imported electricity from Iran. In early 2024, Pakistan officially approved the Iran–Pakistan gas pipeline.

== Conservation and consumption ==
Due to rising demand and a failing power infrastructure severe electricity shortages have occurred in Pakistan. This has led to widespread rolling blackouts that have paralysed industry and led to protests and rioting. Power outages can last 6–8 hours a day in the cities and many more in the rural areas. According to Mahnaz Parach of Network for Consumer Protection, "Children can't do their homework. Housework doesn't get done, as washing machines and other appliances cannot work. When you go home from work, you have no idea whether there will be electricity at home. Your whole life is disturbed."

Experts have warned of an impending energy crisis since 2006. Speaking at a Seminar 'Fueling the Future: Meeting Pakistan's Energy Needs in the 21st Century' held in Washington, D.C. in June 2006 then energy adviser to the prime minister of Pakistan Mukhtar Ahmed stated that the country was taking steps to address the energy shortage. The Pakistan Electric Power Company estimates that there is a shortage of 6 gigawatts, or about 60% of its total generation. One of the main reasons of the shortage is thought to be the failure of past governments to anticipate growth in need and the delay in implementation of projects to increase power production. In addition there is widespread power theft and lack of investment in the existing power grid.

The United States has made improving Pakistan's power infrastructure one of its top priorities. US special envoy Richard Holbrooke, while describing the power situation in Pakistan as "unacceptable," stated that the US would go to its "absolute limits" to help Pakistan overcome the crisis.

In response to rising global oil prices, the Government of Pakistan has introduced measure to reduce fuel consumption. These include temporarily closing schools, moving certain government online, and implementing fuel-conservation policies across departments. Officials stated that the steps aim to lower energy demand, reduce import cost, and manage inflation amid economic pressures.

=== Power sources and electrical energy ===
Measures are aimed at cutting consumption by 500 megawatts. The official weekend has been extended from one to two days. Neon signs and decorative lights have been banned. Power has been cut to government offices by 50% and air conditioners will only be allowed to be switched on after 11 am. Street markets have been asked to close early. Commercial centres except drug stores will be closed at 8 pm and wedding celebrations will be limited to three hours. The government will pay off its $1.38 billion debt to power producers allowing them to pay fuel suppliers. Power supply to Pakistan's commercial capital Karachi will be decreased by 300 megawatts to allow fairer distribution of power to the remaining parts of the country. Tube wells will not be allowed to operate from 7 pm to 11 pm. The measures were to be reviewed on 30 July 2010.

=== Consumption by computers ===
Since the early 1990s, the country has observed the highest growth rate in usage of computers that effect the supply of the electricity produced in the system. In a survey published by the Express Tribune, around 30 million citizens (out of 180 million) use the internet on a daily basis; the internet penetration in the country had reached 16% as of 2013.

=== Variations by regions ===
In the days following the announcement, traders in Lahore rejected the government's decision and kept the markets open after 8 pm in defiance of the ban. Shops were kept open in other cities also after 8 pm. Kashif Shabbir, president of the Rawalpindi Chamber of Commerce warned the situation would get worse if authorities used force to implement the decision. There was confusion over implementation of the two-day weekend, and many banks and educational institutions remained open. Commenting on the defiant mood of the traders, an editorial in Dawn urged everyone to find middle ground.

Reacting to the decision to curtail power supply to Karachi, the "City of Lights", leaders of various political parties in the Provincial Assembly of Sindh condemned the decision and some of them called it "a conspiracy to create a law and order situation." Former Nazim of Karachi, Naimatullah Khan warned that curtailing the power supply of the city could lead to street battles between protesters and law enforcement.

Some analysts have predicted that reduction in the banks' workweek to 5 days will result in revenue losses.

The prevailing energy crisis in Pakistan is taking away 2 percent (or Rs 380 billion) of the economy, despite the government has spent Rs 1.1 trillion as subsidies on the sector in the last four-year which accounts for 2.5 percent of the total volume of economy.

During June 2012, President Asif Ali Zardari had said that the government realised the enormity of the challenge of energy shortage and was determined to overcome it in the shortest possible time.

== International co-operation ==
Pakistan is already importing small quantity of electricity from Iran to supply power to Gwadar town. Pakistan is also actively considering to import electricity from India and Tajikistan. The World Bank offered to finance the feasibility study to import 1200 MW of power from India.

Pakistan is also exploring to import PNG via pipeline through Wagha border from India. India would import the required LNG and re-gasified LNG (RLNG) would be pumped through its pipelines up to the border point. Iran–Pakistan gas pipeline is pending for a long time to receive PNG from Iran for the needs of both Pakistan and India. However, due to the sharp deterioration in India-Pakistan relations, the pipeline is currently changed to be used only by Iran and Pakistan. Pakistan is also planning the Turkmenistan–Afghanistan–Pakistan–India pipeline.

Pakistan started importing discounted Russian oil in June 2023 to prevent energy price hikes caused by the economic crisis. The 100,000 bpd of Russian oil imported accounts for two-thirds of Pakistan's daily consumption.

== See also ==
- Effects of global warming on South Asia
- Electricity sector in Pakistan
- Energy crisis
