= Kot Addu Power =

Pakistani Power Company

Kot Addu Power Company
- Type: Public
- Traded as: PSX: KAPCO; KSE 100 component
- Industry: Electric power
- Founded: 1996; 30 years ago
- Headquarters: Kot Addu, Punjab, Pakistan
- Area served: Pakistan
- Key people: Aftab Mahmood Butt (CEO); Sajjad Ghani (Chairman)
- Revenue: ▼ Rs. 25.43 billion (US$91 million) (2023)
- Operating income: ▼ Rs. 13.07 billion (US$47 million) (2023)
- Net income: ▼ Rs. 3.95 billion (US$14 million) (2023)
- Total assets: ▼ Rs. 101.84 billion (US$360 million) (2023)
- Total equity: ▼ Rs. 66.08 billion (US$240 million) (2023)
- Number of employees: 449 (2023)
- Website: kapco.com.pk

The Kot Addu Power Company (KAPCO) (Urdu: کوٹ ادّو پاور کمپنی) is a Pakistani electric power company based in Lahore. It formerly operated a multi-fuel fired power plant in Kot Addu District, Punjab. The plant had a nameplate capacity of 1,600 MW consisting of 15 generating units.

== History ==
Kot Addu power station was built by the Water and Power Development Authority (WAPDA) in five phases between 1985 and 1996 in Muzaffargarh District, Punjab, at a site located about 90 kilometres north-west of Multan on the left bank of the Indus River near Taunsa Barrage. Kot Addu Power Company Limited was incorporated as a public limited company under the Companies Ordinance, 1984, on 25 April 1996, with the objective of acquiring the power plant from WAPDA.

On 27 June 1996, following international competitive bidding by the Privatisation Commission of the Government of Pakistan, KAPCO was privatised and the United Kingdom-based National Power (later International Power) acquired a 36% stake from WAPDA.

In February 2005, the Privatisation Commission, acting on behalf of WAPDA, sold a further 18% of WAPDA's holding at a strike price of PKR 30 to the general public through a public offering. On 18 April 2005, KAPCO was listed on the Karachi, Lahore, and Islamabad Stock Exchanges.

In 2014, National Power sold its entire shareholding to the local investors. In 2016, the Privatisation Commission approved the offloading of the government's remaining 40.25% stake in KAPCO on the stock market as part of an agreement with the International Monetary Fund.

KAPCO's original 25-year power purchase agreement (PPA) with WAPDA, signed in 1996, was set to expire in June 2021, but was extended by 485 days under a third amendment to the agreement that settled a long-standing dispute over liquidated damages and outages caused by fuel shortages between 2008 and 2016. The PPA finally expired on 24 October 2022, after which KAPCO's plant was placed in preservation mode and ceased dispatching electricity to the Central Power Purchasing Agency (CPPA-G). The company reported zero electricity generation in financial year 2024 as a result.

In 2024, KAPCO submitted the lowest tariff bids in K-Electric's competitive bidding for two utility-scale solar projects: a 150 MW project at Deh Metha Ghar, Sindh, and a 120 MW project at Deh Halkani in Karachi, both at a tariff of Rs9.83 per kilowatt-hour. In December 2024, Shahab Qader Khan was appointed chief executive officer for a three-year term beginning 22 January 2025.

In February 2025, the National Electric Power Regulatory Authority (NEPRA) approved the inclusion of KAPCO's plant in the Power Acquisition Plan 2023–2027, and the company reached an agreement in principle to renew the PPA for 500 MW (and the associated switchyard) for three years on a hybrid take-and-pay basis. On 4 June 2025, KAPCO signed a Tripartite Power Purchase Agreement (TPPA) with CPPA-G and the National Grid Company of Pakistan Limited, replacing the expired 1996 PPA. The agreement became effective on 13 September 2025, following completion of the Initial Capacity Test and Heat Rate Test on a 495 MW segment of the plant.

In June 2025, KAPCO and the Fauji Foundation formally expressed intent to jointly acquire 84.06% of Attock Cement from its Lebanese parent, Pharaon Investment Group. In August 2025, KAPCO submitted a binding offer for the Pharaon stake.

The plant was again taken offline on 1 October 2025 following tariff limitations linked to the Indicative Generation Capacity Expansion Plan (IGCEP) and Power Acquisition Programme, before rejoining the national grid in December 2025 after NEPRA issued a determination resolving the dispute.

== Operations ==
KAPCO's power station was one of Pakistan's largest combined cycle thermal power plant, comprising ten multi-fuel-fired gas turbines and five steam turbines arranged in three energy blocks. The plant was capable of operating on three fuels, natural gas (including RLNG), low-sulphur furnace oil, and high-speed diesel.

The plant was classified as black start capable and, due to its location in southern Punjab, served as a key supply point for MEPCO's distribution network.

== See also ==
- List of power stations in Pakistan
