= Privatisation in Pakistan =

Economic programme

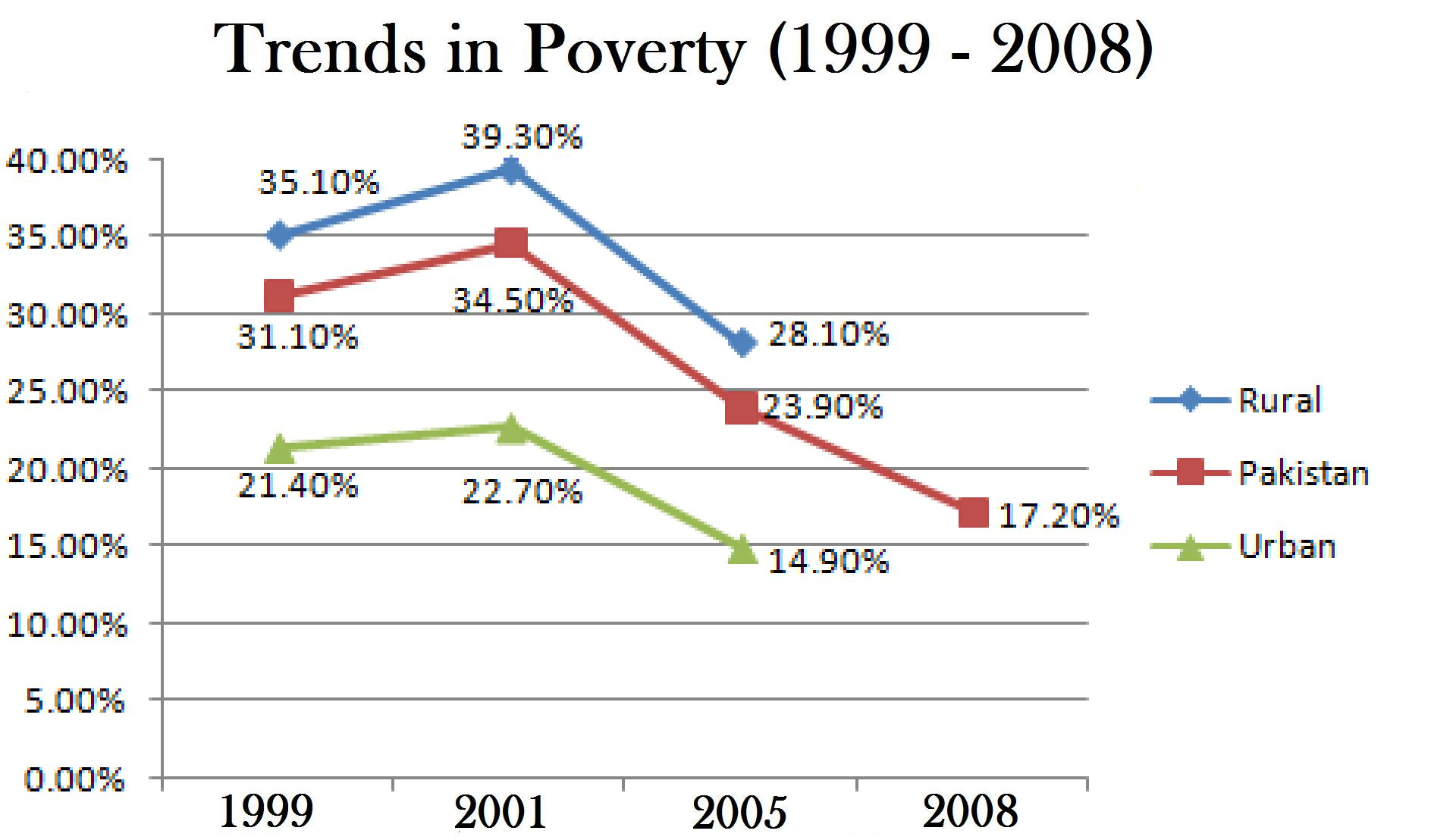
The poverty expenditure rate statistically dropped to 34.5–17.2% in 2008 as part of the privatisation programme.

The privatisation process in Pakistan, sometimes referred to as denationalisation programme or simply the privatisation in Pakistan) is a continuous policy measure program in the economic period of Pakistan. It was first conceived and implemented by the then-people-elected Prime Minister Nawaz Sharif and the Pakistan Muslim League, in an attempt to enable the nationalised industries towards market economy, immediately after the economic collapse of the Soviet Union in 1989–90. The programme was envisaged and visioned to improve the GDP growth of the national economy of Pakistan, and reversal of the nationalisation programme in 1970s – an inverse of the privatisation programme.

In the period of the 1970s, all major private industries and utilities were put under the government ownership in an intensified programme, called the nationalisation programme that led the economic disaster in Pakistan. Since then, the demand for denationalisation gained currency towards the ending of the government of Pakistan Peoples Party in 1977, although a commission was set up by General Zia-ul-Haq government but no denationalisation programme began until 1990.

The privatisation programme was launched on 22 January 1991 by Prime minister Nawaz Sharif in a vision to promote free-market economic principles, private-ownership and the mainstream goal to attract foreign investment in the country. But, as a result a good deal of the national wealth fell into the hands of a relatively small group of so-called business oligarchs (tycoons), and the wealth gap increased dramatically in the 1990s that halted the programme by Benazir Bhutto. Revisions were made in 1999 under President Pervez Musharraf as he launched a much more intensified privatisation programme with the watchful presiding leadership of his Minister of Finance and later Prime Minister Shaukat Aziz. The programme was ended effectively at the end of 2007 when ~80–90% of the industries were put under the management of private ownership.

== History ==
=== 1978 to 1988 ===
The momentum and demands for denationalisation gained currency towards the end of the government of Prime minister Zulfikar Ali Bhutto and Pakistan Peoples Party who under intensified their nationalisation programme had effectively the government-ownership management in the private industries of Pakistan; it had built a strong public-sector with priority on cement, steel and fertilizers. After the end of government of peoples party, a white paper was issued by General Zia-ul-Haq's government, followed by setting up the commission under Pakistan Industrial Credit and Investment Corporation (PICIC) chairman N.M. Ukailie. However, only three industries were returned to its rightful owners, namely Eittefaq Group of Industries to Mian Mohammed Sharif whilst others remains under government controlled.

=== 1989 to 1990 ===
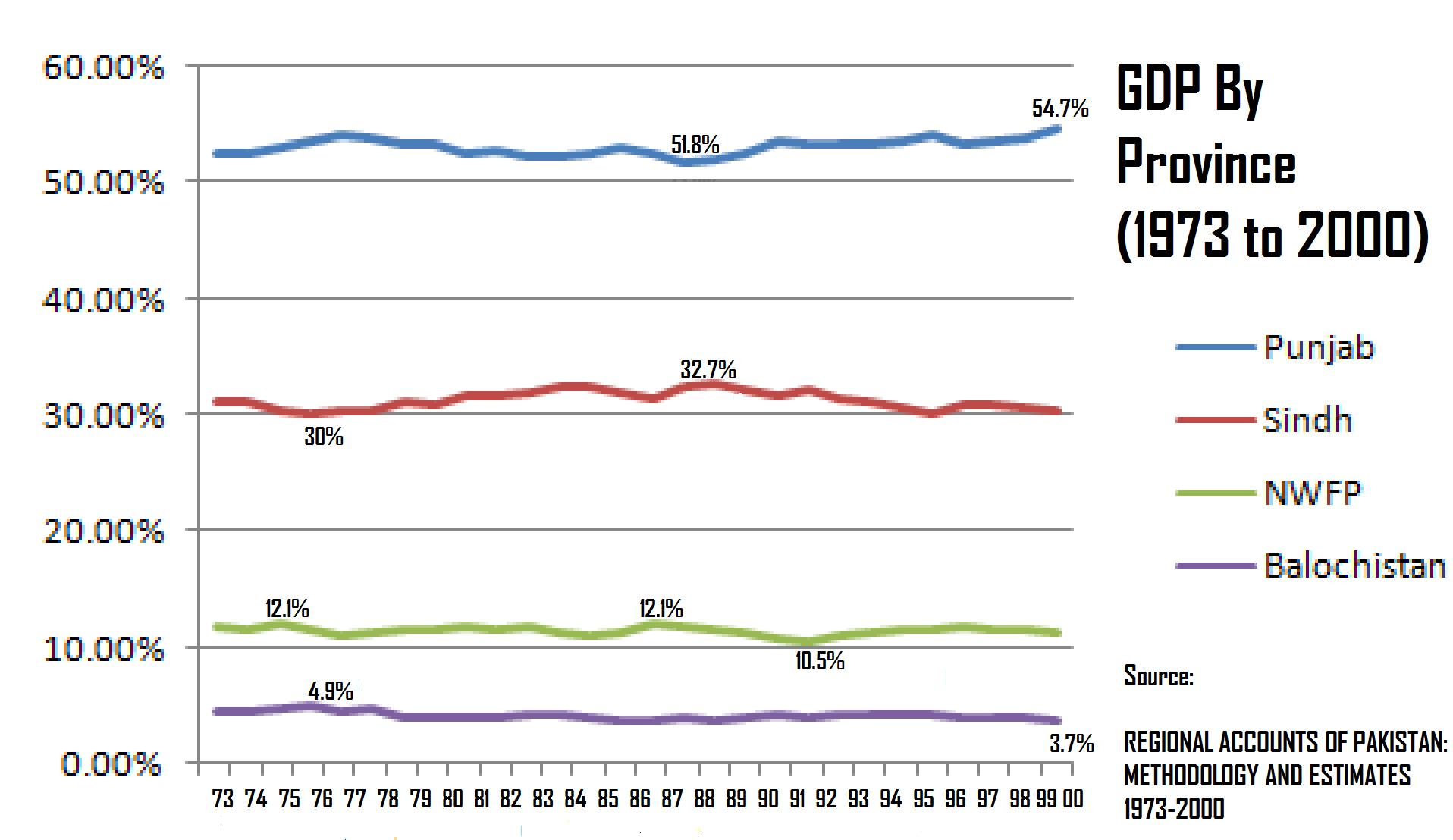
The privatisation programme launched in Punjab which had the higher GDP growth than any province of Pakistan.

As an aftermath of 1988 general elections, Benazir Bhutto and the peoples party returned to power, promising to denationalised and replace with the industrialisation programme by means other than the state intervention.

By August 1989, a committee was established under the supervision of the Minister of State for Finance to oversee this initiative. With consultation from Rothschild's, the committee reviewed several state-owned enterprises for potential privatization, including Muslim Commercial Bank, Habib Bank Limited, Pakistan National Shipping Corporation, Pakistan International Airlines (PIA), Sui Southern Gas, Sui Northern Gas, and Pakistan State Oil. The objective was to integrate the savings of numerous private investors into the stock market, enhancing its stability and standards, a necessity identified since the early 1980s.

In May 1990, the government offered 10 percent of PIA's shares for Rs. 27.4 million, with a promise of a 12.5 percent minimum cash dividend for the following three years. Despite these efforts, other enterprises targeted for privatization remained unsold due to limited interest from the private sector. The process was interrupted when the government was dissolved by the president of Pakistan, resulting in new elections and the establishment of a coalition government.

The partial privatisation was kick started by Chief Minister of Punjab Province Nawaz Sharif who presided the liquidation of many industrial units put under provisional government to private sector. All industries based on Punjab government ownership were returned to its rightful owners on a mutual understanding; the prices on units returned to industrialists are still kept as "top secret" by the provisional government.

=== 1991 to 1993 ===
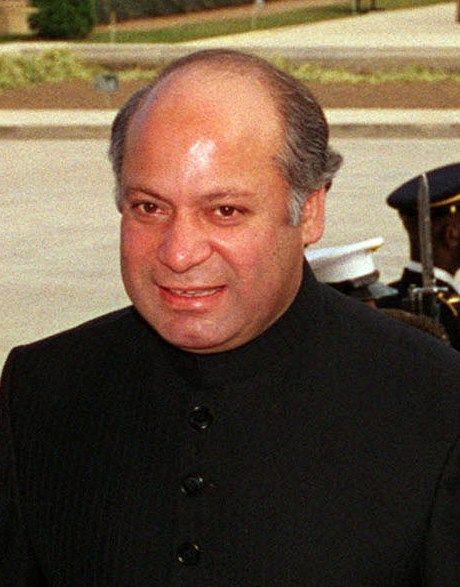
Nawaz Sharif.

A large-scale privatisation programme was launched on 22 January 1991 as the primary economic policy by Prime Minister Nawaz Sharif who came to national power after securing a flight-winning victory in the 1990 general elections. The privatisation programme was inspired and influenced in its nature after witnessing the success of the privatisation in Great-Britain by British Prime minister Margaret Thatcher. The first phase of the privatisation programme covered the half of the public sector industries in terms of total employment, and the programme was in a direct response to Pakistan Peoples Party and Zulfikar Ali Bhutto, and for instance Sharif's privatisation programme was swift as nationalisation programme. During the course of first phase, Sharif presided the denationalisation of banking sector and industries to private sector, starting first with MCB limited. Sharif termed his privatization programme as "turning Pakistan into a (South) Korea by encouraging greater private saving and investment to accelerate economic growth.".

The second phase was promulgated by Sartaj Aziz with the goal to transform the enterprises into profit-seeking businesses, not depended to the government subsidies for their survival. The mega-energy corporations such as Water and Power Development Authority (WAPDA) and Karachi Electric Supply Corporations, and the Pakistan Telecommunication Corporation were set off to private sector. From 1990 to 1993, around 115 industrial units were hastily privatised, including the privatisation two major banks, 68 industrial units and 10% Shares of Sui Northern Gas Pipelines Limited.

The privatisation programme came with great surrounding controversies with lacked competition as the programme was largely controlled by favoured insider. The recklessness and favouritism shown in privatisation of the industrial and banking units by Prime minister Nawaz Sharif was to become the hallmark and the rise of strong business oligarch who have concentrated enormous assets, further increasing the wealth gap in Pakistan and contributing to the political instability.

=== 1993 to 1999 ===
In 1992, the Leader of the Opposition in the Parliament, Benazir Bhutto, vehemently criticised the whole policy measure programme at the public circles. While Commerce minister Faisal Hyatt and Finance minister Sartaj Aziz enthusiastically projected the privatisation as a "success phase", Benazir Bhutto had, with a touch of drama in the state parliament, maintained that "while one brother was selling, other was buying."

After 1993 general elections, the second phase of the privatisation programme began in 1993 under the "disciplined macroeconomics policy" of Prime minister Benazir Bhutto. Her programme aimed to capitalise on the rising business oligarch class but the programme suffered with great difficulties and problems even inside the peoples party. The second phase involves the privatisation of financial institutions, several telecommunications corporations, thermal power plants, oil and gas sectors. Benazir's government did not privatize all state corporations, especially those who were collecting large revenues abroad; only certain industries were privatised which were at the brink of financial collapse.

The first attempt was made to privatise the United Bank Limited but the proposal met with great hostility by the workers union and opposition. Proposals were also made to put the private-ownership to Pakistan Railways but it was rebuffed by Prime minister Benazir Bhutto who quoted: "Railways privatisation will be the "black-hole" of this government. Please never mention the railways to me again." The economic growth declined when the US embargo began to bite the government of Benazir Bhutto. By the end of 1996, ≈20 industrial units, one financial institution, one electric power plant and 12% shares of Pakistan Telecommunications Ltd. were privatised by Benazir Bhutto.

The second phase remained continued until 1998 when it was abruptly ended by Prime Minister Nawaz Sharif after imposing economic emergency after ordering to perform capability of nuclear deterrence in response to Indian nuclear aggression. All stock exchange, stock markets and the second phase of the privatisation programme were immediately halted by Prime minister Nawaz Sharif until his government was ended in 1999.

=== 1999 to 2008 ===
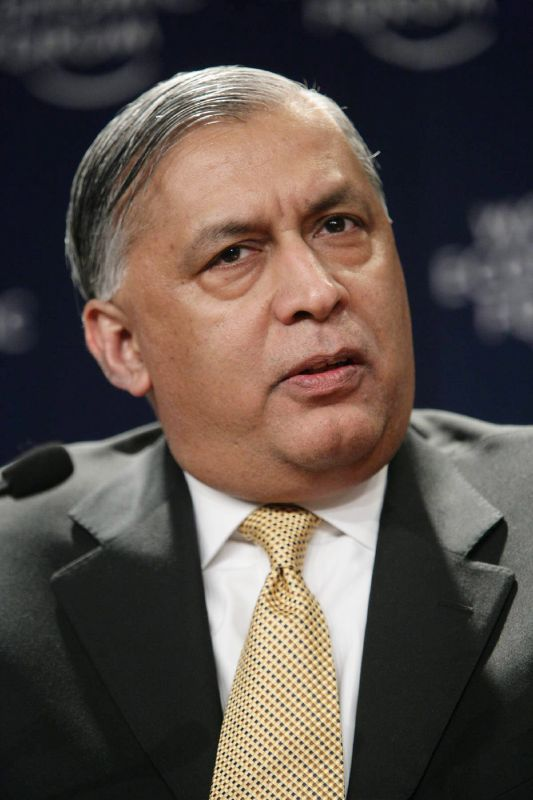
Shaukat Aziz.

After taking control of government from Prime minister Nawaz Sharif, President Pervez Musharraf invited Shaukat Aziz to fix the declining economy of Pakistan. The GDP rate had declined from 10.0% in the 1980s to 3.6% in 1999, with foreign debt increased to 44% up as compared to 1986. Major economic reforms were introduced by Shaukat Aziz who first consolidated the industries under one platform and restructured them before setting them to privatization market. Numbers of controversial sales tax were enforced by Shaukat Aziz, mostly on import duties; and based on these reforms, patronage-based industries remained under serious threat and privatisation discussion began to take place on usual based. Aziz consistently worked on to restructured the industries and provided a vital leadership and economic relief after 2001 also played an important role in strengthening the patronage-based industries financially and physically.

In 2004, Aziz became Prime minister and initiated an intensified privatisation programme in order to grow the GDP rate annually.

Aziz forcefully and aggressively pushed 100% privatisation of state-owned corporations while virtually planned to privatised 85% of banking sector. Starting from 2003 until 2007, Aziz successfully privatized 80% of the banking industry into private-ownership enterprises, while privatizing the numbers of shares of Pakistan International Airlines and other mega-corporations into the public circles.

Nothing is sacred... We are packaging up our companies. (....).... These state-owned corporations (SOEs) have been well-run for the past few years.... and now we are offering them to investors from all over the world....!

— Shaukat Aziz, 2006, source

The intensified privatisation programme led the economic boom of Pakistan's economy which was at the range of 8.96–9.0% in 2004.

Intensified privatisation policies had major impact on public sector organisation which diminished with the privatization of the state-owned corporations. Prime minister Aziz defended his privatisation programme as he maintained that "these institutions viable while they were on the verge of collapse.". Aziz's privatisation programme subsequently improved the country's growth rate by 6.4–8.6% a year. Inflation rate dropped to 3.5% in last 3 years as against 11–12% in 1990. However, in the end of 2007, Aziz's privatisation programme suffered a major set back which initially halted the privatisation programme in the country. The Supreme Court halted the privatisation of Pakistan Steel Mills after transferring the inquiry from FIA to NAB, while issued standing orders to keep the Steel Mills under the nationalization programme. The proceedings and Supreme Court's decision initially halted Aziz's intensified and aggressive privatisation programme at the end days of his tenure.

=== 2021 to present ===
The government will likely fetch Rs. 100 billion in fiscal year (FY21) through the privatisation of state-owned entities, said Privatisation Minister Muhammad Mian Soomro.

Initial work for the privatisation of power distribution companies and State Life has been started, while the privatisation of Haveli Bahadur Shah Power Plant in Jhang and Baloki Power Plant in Kasur, two RLNG-based power plants, was in the final phases.

On 26 August 2021, Services International Hotel in Lahore was auctioned at the highest bid of Rs. 1.951 billion. The transaction was formally concluded in November 2024 with the signing of the sale agreement after delays and legal/regulatory clearances.

In July 2025, Pakistan Railways decided to hand over the commercial management of 11 trains to the private sector in an effort to improve travel facilities and increase revenue. These included Hazara Express, Bahauddin Zakaria Express, Millat Express, Subak Kharam Express, Rawal Express, Badar Express, Ghori Express, Ravi Express, Thall Express, Faiz Ahmed Faiz Passenger, and Mohenjo Daro Passenger. The infrastructure and regulatory control of the trains were retained by Pakistan Railways, however.

==== Privatisation Programme (2024–29) ====
In 2024, the Privatisation Commission of Pakistan published a multi-year programme (2024–29) identifying multiple SOEs privatisation.

First Women Bank was privatised in October 2025, when the Government of Pakistan sold its majority stake to UAE-based International Holding Company through a government-to-government transaction.

Pakistan International Airlines was partially privatised in December 2025, after the government of Pakistan held a televised auction to sell a majority stake in the airline. A consortium led by Arif Habib Corporation submitted the highest bid of Rs 135 billion and acquired 75% of PIA, giving the consortium management control, while the government retained 25%.

== Public perception ==
The privatisation programme still marks the question of "big" controversies. In public circles, it has generated much more heated debates where it is perceived to have more negative impact on civil society. The general perception remains highly contentious and polarising issue in the civil society, gearing up the negative sentiments among the population, including the continued injection of public money in many privatised entities and less than expected improvement in the services. Although, the programme produced a relatively faster and efficient way of promoting competition and enhancing growth, on the other hand, the programme experienced the exponential increase in unemployment, reducing the access of workers' class to the basic needs of life and contributed in declining the social status of workers' class in to poor get poorer.

But on the other hand, a significant support for the privatisation programme has been raised in the media. In an editorial written in Dawn, it argues that the privatisation programme has been a key "constituent of structural reform" programmes in both, the developed and developing economies, in order to achieve greater microeconomic efficiency as opposed to macroeconomics. Overall, the GDP rate grows smoothly with privatisation programme remains in effect as opposed to nationalisation programme that it had dropped the GDP growth rate of Pakistan, Dawn maintained. Major proposals were made to privatise the major and most-profitable industries of Pakistan, namely the Pakistan Railways (PR) where The Express Tribune argued that the national railways' condition has gone from bad to worse under government ownership, and only privatisation programme can save the railways with the creation of sense of competition that would drive improvement.

=== Adversary opposition ===
Despite its success, the public sector organisations, labour and workers unions remain extremely hostile towards the privatisation programmes. In 2005, major demonstrations and worker's revolt took place in Islamabad by the PTCL Workers Unions Action Committee, in an attempt to privatize the Pakistan Telecommunication Company Ltd (PTCL). Despite the demonstrations the state-corporation was privatised by Shaukat Aziz which resulted in workers losing their jobs.

In 2012, an unsuccessful attempt was carried out by current government of Pakistan Peoples Party when the government sought to privatise the mega-state corporations, particularly the power sector; major nationalised industries such as WAPDA, IESCo, TESCo, PEPCo were proposed by the finance ministry to privatise the power distribution companies. Major workers strike were initiated by the central labour unions, and after receiving much criticism, his government halted the privatisation programme of energy sector, and nationalised the remaining power sector industries due to public pressure.

The Pakistan Peoples Party's intellectuals remain skeptical about the privatisation programme and targeted the controversial implementation on numerous occasions. The peoples party maintained that "an elitist or top-notch educational system" which exceedingly comprises private sector's foreign affiliated schools and universities, has built the "sole source" of producing some proficient minds. While on the other hand, the privatised Madrassah system of education has been patronise different sects of religion, patronise different sects of religion, and further exploited as source of religious extremism and associated with terrorist outfits and their offshoot. The private sector education system negative effects of private sector education and it has created a disparity between the rich and the poor.

Dr. Professor Athar Maqsood of School of Business of the National University of Sciences and Technology (NUST), set forward his argumentative thesis that there are two reasons behind why the privatisation has not been successful as was originally perceived are economic reasons and socio-psychological and political reasons. In the 1990s, the privatised enterprises have laid off employees by introducing schemes like golden hand shake.

== See also ==
- Nationalisation in Pakistan
- Pakistan Muslim League (N)
- Right-wing politics in Pakistan
- Economy of Pakistan

== Sources ==
- Akbar, Bilal. "Privatization in Pakistan". Bilal Akbar.
- Kemal, PhD, Dr. A.R. "Privatization in Pakistan" (google docs).
- Hussain, Ishrat (17 August 2005). "Why Privatization is necessary for economical growth in Pakistan" (googledocs). Governor of State Bank of Pakistan. Dr. Ishrat Hussain, State Bank of Pakistan. p. 10.
- Aziz, Sartaj (1990). Privatisation in Pakistan (google books). Paris: Organization for Economic Cooperation and Development. ISBN 92-64-15310-1.
