= Ministry of Energy (Pakistan) =

Ministry of the Government of Pakistan

- وزارت توانائی
- State emblem of Pakistan

Agency overview
- Formed: 4 August 2017; 8 years ago (In its current form); 14 August 1947
- Jurisdiction: Government of Pakistan
- Headquarters: Pakistan Secretariat in Red Zone, Islamabad; 33°44′13.97″N 73°05′36.18″E
- Minister responsible: Awais Leghari Minister of Energy
- Agency executives: A. P. Malik (Minister of State for Petroleum); Mashhood Ahmed (Secretary of Petroleum); Dr. Fakhre Alam (Secretary of Power)
- Parent agency: Ministry of Petroleum and Natural Resources
- Website: Power Division; Petroleum Division

The Ministry of Energy (Urdu: وزارت توانائی, Trans. Wazarat-e-Tawanai, abbreviated as: MoE) is a cabinet-level executive ministry of the federal Government of Pakistan that is charged with implementation of the national energy policy and energy production and electricity transmission throughout the country.

The MoE functions are split in two divisions: Petroleum and Power – each independent of its tasks and objectives. The MoE oversees overall domestic hydropower generation, implementing the energy security policies, petroleum and energy production by means of alternative energy sources, and energy conservation.

The MoE is headed by an elected Minister of Energy who is assisted by Minister of States (as its deputies) and secretaries of each division to implement the MoE's policies and works.

In spite of nuclear power serving as a critical component of the energy grid system, the Ministry of Energy does not oversee the nuclear power generation but its responsibility is vested with the Pakistan Atomic Energy Commission (PAEC).

== Overview ==
=== History ===
From 1947 until 2017, the former Ministry of Water and Power (MoWP) was charged with overseeing the energy projects and water resources management. In Pakistan, the word "Power" is used to address energy, energy conservation and production as it deals directly with the subject of electricity, which includes generation, transmission and distribution.

The Ministry of Energy (MoE) was created per the recommendation from the World Bank to "help the federal government to improve coordination in power production and installation of new energy projects under the China–Pakistan Economic Corridor (CPEC).

== Power Division ==
Responsible for electricity generation, transmission, distribution and policy matters pertaining to these three functions. The MoE funds twenty two public sector companies and two regulatory bodies that works under the Power Division. The Power Division has its own departmental director – the Power Secretary of Pakistan.

== List of Ministers ==
Ministers of Energy	Entered office	Left office
Sikandar Zaman	9 March 1981	26 February 1985
Zafarullah Khan Jamali	10 April 1985	28 January 1986
Lt-Gen. Jamal Said Mian	28 January 1986	20 December 1986
Abdul Majeed Abid	1 February 1987	15 May 1988
Wazir Ahmad Jogezai	15 May 1988	29 May 1988
Elahi Bux Soomro (Caretaker)	9 June 1988	20 November 1988
Farooq Leghari	28 December 1988	6 August 1990
Ghulam Mustafa Khar (Caretaker)	7 August 1990	6 November 1990
Shahzada Muhammad Yousaf	10 September 1991	18 July 1993
Khursheed K . Marker (Caretaker)	5 August 1993	19 October 1993
Ghulam Mustafa Khar	26 January 1994	5 November 1996
Abdullah J. Memon (Caretaker)	5 November 1996	17 February 1997
Nisar Ali Khan	25 February 1997	11 July 1997
Nadir Pervez	11 July 1997	6 August 1998
Gohar Ayub Khan	6 August 1998	10 October 1999
Lt-Gen. Muzaffar Hussain Usmani	10 October 1999	23 November 2002
Aftab Ahmad Sherpao	23 November 2002	25 August 2004
Liaquat Ali Jatoi	30 June 2004	15 November 2007
Tariq Hameed (Caretaker)	22 November 2007	25 March 2008
Pervez Ashraf	31 March 2008	11 February 2011
Naveed Qamar	5 March 2011	2 June 2012
Ahmad Mukhtar	4 June 2012	16 March 2013
Musadik Malik (Caretaker)	3 April 2013	4 June 2013
Muhammad Asif	7 June 2013	28 July 2018
Imran Khan	18 August 2018	11 September 2018
Omar Ayub	11 September 2018	10 April 2022
Khurram Dastgir	19 April 2022	10 August 2023
Awais Leghari	18 March 2024	present

== See also ==
- Energy policy of Pakistan
- Petroleum Secretary of Pakistan
- Alternative Energy Development Board
- Central Power Purchasing Agency (CPPA)
- National Engineering Services Pakistan
- National Transmission & Despatch Company
- National Electric Power Regulatory Authority
- Private Power & Infrastructure Board (PPIB)
- Power Information Technology Company
- Water and Power Development Authority
- Pakistan Electric Power Company
