= List of countries by electricity consumption =

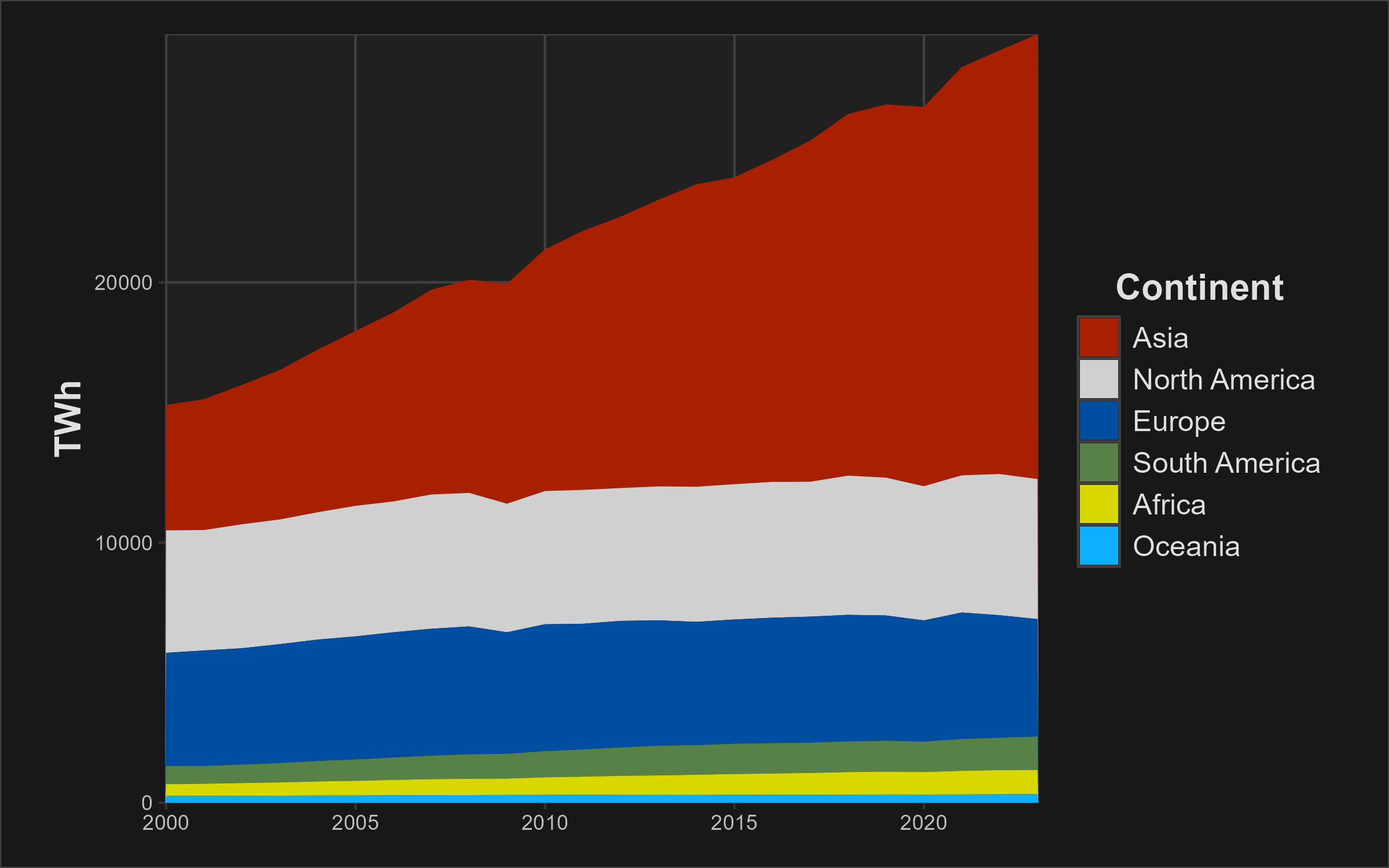
Electricity consumption by continent

This is a list of countries by electric energy consumption. China is the largest producer and consumer of electricity, representing 55% of consumption in Asia and 31% of the world in 2023.

== Consumption by country ==
Data in this table are from Ember and are for 2025 unless otherwise specified. It includes some dependent territories. Total consumption figures are in terawatt-hours (TWh) while per capita (i.e., per person) figures are in megawatt-hours (MWh).

Links for each location go to the relevant electricity market page, when available.

Location	Consumption (TWh p.a.)	Per capita (MWh p.a.)	Year
World	31,746.92	3.86	2025
China	10,560.24	7.46	2025
United States	4,535.81	13.06	2025
India	2,082.82	1.42	2025
Russia	1,176.11	8.17	2025
Japan	1,029.86	8.37	2025
Brazil	762.12	3.58	2025
Canada	645.63	16.09	2025
South Korea	624.66	12.09	2025
Germany	520.27	6.19	2025
France	477.49	7.16	2025
Saudi Arabia	454.59	13.39	2024
Iran	395.60	4.28	2025
Indonesia	372.50	1.31	2024
Mexico	356.66	2.70	2025
Turkey	351.93	4.01	2025
United Kingdom	321.38	4.62	2025
Vietnam	313.59	3.09	2025
Italy	311.60	5.27	2025
Taiwan	288.39	12.48	2025
Australia	286.34	10.62	2025
Spain	275.70	5.76	2025
Egypt	244.31	2.06	2025
South Africa	236.84	3.66	2025
Thailand	225.10	3.14	2025
Malaysia	199.91	5.56	2025
United Arab Emirates	177.02	16.05	2024
Poland	174.31	4.57	2025
Argentina	162.43	3.54	2025
Iraq	156.83	3.41	2024
Norway	137.71	24.49	2025
Sweden	137.11	12.87	2025
Pakistan	185.9	0.77	2025
Kazakhstan	126.10	6.05	2025
Philippines	123.12	1.05	2025
Netherlands	121.11	6.60	2025
Bangladesh	118.06	0.67	2025
Ukraine	111.61	2.72	2022
Algeria	93.84	2.01	2024
Kuwait	92.49	18.40	2025
Colombia	91.61	1.72	2025
Uzbekistan	89.63	2.42	2025
Chile	88.50	4.46	2025
Finland	87.78	15.61	2025
Belgium	86.56	7.36	2025
Venezuela	80.13	2.82	2024
Austria	75.84	8.32	2025
Israel	75.70	7.95	2025
Czech Republic	68.04	6.41	2025
Switzerland	65.12	7.26	2025
Peru	60.47	1.75	2025
Singapore	60.44	10.30	2025
Portugal	60.36	5.80	2025
Qatar	56.18	18.03	2025
Greece	55.56	5.59	2025
Romania	54.39	2.88	2025
Oman	52.84	9.62	2025
Hungary	48.90	5.08	2025
Hong Kong	48.81	6.58	2024
Morocco	46.69	1.22	2025
Belarus	44.89	4.99	2025
New Zealand	43.34	8.25	2025
Denmark	40.67	6.78	2025
Nigeria	39.24	0.17	2025
Bahrain	38.44	23.92	2024
Ireland	37.66	7.10	2025
Serbia	37.40	5.59	2025
Ecuador	36.64	2.00	2025
Bulgaria	36.53	5.44	2025
Libya	34.59	4.69	2024
Ethiopia	31.02	0.23	2025
Paraguay	29.65	4.23	2025
North Korea	27.10	1.02	2024
Slovakia	26.75	4.89	2025
Azerbaijan	26.54	2.55	2025
Tunisia	24.90	2.02	2025
Syria	24.28	0.98	2024
Turkmenistan	24.01	3.20	2024
Jordan	23.73	2.05	2024
Dominican Republic	22.68	1.97	2025
Cambodia	22.39	1.25	2025
Myanmar	21.92	0.40	2024
Ghana	21.83	0.63	2024
Croatia	20.05	5.21	2025
Puerto Rico	19.58	6.05	2025
Cuba	19.43	1.77	2024
Kyrgyzstan	19.23	2.64	2025
Iceland	19.05	48.42	2024
Tajikistan	18.81	1.74	2025
Congo	17.36	0.16	2024
Sri Lanka	17.25	0.74	2025
Zambia	16.60	0.78	2024
Mozambique	16.49	0.48	2024
Guatemala	16.35	0.89	2024
Laos	15.61	2.01	2024
Angola	15.59	0.41	2024
Kenya	15.58	0.27	2025
Sudan	15.57	0.31	2024
Uruguay	14.75	4.36	2025
Georgia	14.70	3.86	2025
Slovenia	14.31	6.76	2025
Bolivia	13.63	1.08	2025
Panama	13.29	2.94	2024
Honduras	12.63	1.17	2024
Bhutan	12.46	15.74	2024
Costa Rica	12.45	2.42	2025
Mongolia	12.41	3.53	2025
Lithuania	12.32	4.35	2025
Zimbabwe	12.10	0.73	2024
Bosnia and Herzegovina	12.09	3.85	2025
Nepal	11.03	0.37	2024
Ivory Coast	10.06	0.32	2024
Trinidad and Tobago	9.55	6.33	2024
Estonia	9.34	6.95	2025
Tanzania	9.03	0.13	2024
Albania	8.67	3.11	2024
North Macedonia	8.35	4.60	2025
Senegal	8.13	0.44	2024
Palestine	7.99	1.45	2024
Latvia	7.52	4.06	2025
Kosovo	7.38	4.41	2025
Cameroon	7.32	0.25	2024
Armenia	7.09	2.40	2025
Afghanistan	6.82	0.16	2024
Luxembourg	6.70	9.85	2025
Macau	6.28	8.72	2024
El Salvador	6.27	0.99	2025
Moldova	6.17	2.06	2025
Cyprus	5.91	4.31	2025
Brunei	5.56	12.02	2024
Mali	5.46	0.22	2024
Nicaragua	5.42	0.78	2024
Congo	5.38	0.85	2024
Uganda	5.37	0.11	2024
Lebanon	5.34	0.92	2024
Yemen	5.25	0.13	2024
Jamaica	4.92	1.73	2024
Papua New Guinea	4.73	0.45	2024
Botswana	4.67	1.85	2024
Montenegro	4.34	6.86	2025
Namibia	4.04	1.33	2024
Guinea	4.03	0.27	2024
Mauritius	3.41	2.68	2024
Malta	3.23	5.92	2025
Burkina Faso	3.19	0.14	2024
Gabon	3.18	1.25	2024
New Caledonia	3.12	10.66	2024
Réunion	3.07	3.51	2023
Madagascar	2.43	0.08	2024
Mauritania	2.37	0.46	2024
Benin	2.31	0.16	2024
Bahamas	2.25	5.61	2024
Togo	2.21	0.23	2024
Niger	2.15	0.08	2024
Guam	1.86	11.09	2024
Malawi	1.81	0.08	2024
Suriname	1.74	2.74	2024
Guadeloupe	1.67	4.44	2023
Eswatini	1.65	1.33	2024
Martinique	1.51	4.36	2023
Equatorial Guinea	1.49	0.79	2024
Guyana	1.38	1.66	2024
Rwanda	1.22	0.09	2024
Fiji	1.15	1.24	2024
Barbados	1.11	3.93	2024
Aruba	1.00	9.25	2024
French Guiana	0.98	3.23	2023
Haiti	0.86	0.07	2024
Belize	0.85	2.04	2024
Maldives	0.85	1.61	2024
Djibouti	0.80	0.69	2024
French Polynesia	0.72	2.56	2024
Cayman Islands	0.71	9.54	2024
U.S. Virgin Islands	0.68	7.94	2023
Seychelles	0.63	4.83	2024
Bermuda	0.61	9.44	2024
Greenland	0.60	10.75	2024
Lesotho	0.58	0.25	2024
Burundi	0.57	0.04	2024
Liberia	0.57	0.10	2024
South Sudan	0.56	0.05	2024
Cape Verde	0.52	0.99	2024
Gambia	0.51	0.19	2024
Timor-Leste	0.51	0.36	2024
Faroe Islands	0.49	8.96	2023
Eritrea	0.45	0.13	2024
Somalia	0.43	0.02	2024
Saint Lucia	0.40	2.23	2024
Antigua and Barbuda	0.37	3.95	2024
Chad	0.37	0.02	2024
Turks and Caicos Islands	0.27	5.80	2024
Grenada	0.24	2.05	2024
Saint Kitts and Nevis	0.23	4.91	2024
Gibraltar	0.22	5.59	2024
Sierra Leone	0.21	0.02	2024
American Samoa	0.18	3.85	2024
British Virgin Islands	0.17	4.36	2023
Samoa	0.16	0.73	2024
Dominica	0.15	2.26	2023
Saint Vincent and the Grenadines	0.15	1.49	2024
Central African Republic	0.14	0.03	2023
Comoros	0.14	0.17	2023
Solomon Islands	0.11	0.13	2024
São Tomé and Príncipe	0.09	0.39	2023
Western Sahara	0.09	0.23	2009
Guinea-Bissau	0.08	0.04	2024
Vanuatu	0.08	0.25	2023
Tonga	0.07	0.67	2024
Nauru	0.05	4.19	2024
Saint Pierre and Miquelon	0.05	8.80	2023
Cook Islands	0.04	2.91	2024
Kiribati	0.04	0.30	2024
Falkland Islands	0.01	2.88	2023
Montserrat	0.01	2.28	2024
Saint Helena, Ascension and Tristan da Cunha	0.01	1.89	2023
Niue	0.00		2023

== Consumption by continent ==
Continent	Consumption (TWh p.a.)	Per capita (MWh p.a.)
Asia	16,704.91	3.76
North America	5,172.81	13.35
Europe	5,101.30	6.12
Latin America and Caribbean	1,846.23	2.77
Middle East	1,581.74	5.26
Africa	997.77	0.64
Oceania	342.16	7.38

== See also ==
- Electric energy consumption
- Electricity by country
- List of countries by energy consumption per capita
- List of countries by energy intensity
- List of countries by energy consumption and production
- List of countries by renewable electricity production
- World energy supply and consumption
