= Hubco Coal Power Project =

Coal power plant project in Pakistan

- Country: Pakistan
- Location: Mouza Kund, Hub, Lasbela District, Balochistan
- Coordinates: 24°54′54″N 66°41′19″E
- Status: Operational
- Construction began: March 2017
- Commission date: 17 August 2019
- Construction cost: US$1.995 billion
- Owner: China Power Hub Generation Company (CPHGC)
- Operator: CPHGC

Power generation
- Units operational: 2 × 660 MW
- Nameplate capacity: 1,320 MW

The Hubco Coal Power Project (also known as the China Power Hub Generation Company or CPHGC) is a 1,320 MW super‑critical, imported-coal fired power station at Mouza Kund, Hub in Lasbela District, Balochistan, Pakistan. Developed as an early‑harvest energy scheme of the China–Pakistan Economic Corridor (CPEC), it began commercial operation on 17 August 2019.

== History ==
Government processing for a large coal plant at Hub began in November 2014, followed by a letter of intent in June 2015 to a new joint venture between Hub Power Company (Hubco) and China Power International Holding (CPIH). A formal Joint‑Venture Agreement was signed on 20 April 2015, which established the project vehicle now known as CPHGC. The NEPRA approved an up‑front tariff for the scheme on 12 February 2016 and issued a 30‑year generation licence that September.

Construction followed a ground‑breaking ceremony on 21 March 2017, and an operation and maintenance contract was concluded in April 2018 with Chinese engineering firms. Unit 1 was synchronised to the grid on 28 December 2018 and Unit 2 on 28 May 2019; a purpose‑built coal jetty became operational in late 2018. The Central Power Purchasing Agency certified commercial operation from 17 August 2019 with an initial tested capacity of 1,249 MW.

== Financing and ownership ==
The final capital cost was reported at US$1.995 billion on a 75:25 debt‑to‑equity ratio. A US$1.496 billion syndicated loan, led by China Development Bank and the Export–Import Bank of China with ICBC, China Construction Bank and Bank of Communications, was signed in Chengdu on 24 October 2017. At financial close in 2018 the equity split stood at 74 percent CPIH and 26 percent Hubco, but by 2024 it had shifted to 52.5 percent China Power International (Pakistan) Investment Ltd. and 47.5 percent Hub Power Holdings Ltd.

== Tariff ==
CPHGC operates on an up‑front levelised tariff of 8.3601 US ¢ per kWh, which approved on 12 February 2016 by NEPRA for a thirty‑year time period. The tariff is denominated in US dollars, passes through fuel and inflation and has a return on equity component of 27.2 percent.
