= 2021 Pakistan blackout =

Power outage in Pakistan

- Date: 9 January 2021
- Time: 11.41pm local time (1841 GMT)
- Location: Across Pakistan
- Cause: An engineering fault in Guddu power plant in southern Pakistan
- Property damage: Rs.50 million fine imposed on the National Transmission & Despatch Company (NTDC)

The 2021 Pakistan blackout was a power outage that occurred across Pakistan on January 9, 2021.

== Cause ==
The Power Minister Omar Ayub cited the reason that at 11.41pm local time (1841 GMT) on Saturday January 9, the blackout was caused by “an engineering fault” in Guddu power plant in southern Pakistan which tripped the system and caused power plants to shut down.

== Areas affected ==
Areas affected by power cuts include the capital Islamabad, along with major cities such as Karachi, Lahore, Peshawar, Multan, Quetta, Rawalpindi, Faisalabad, Muzaffargarh, Narowal, Bhakkar, Kabirwala, Khanewal, Bahawalpur and Sukkur. Between 80 and 90 per cent electricity supply was suspended during the blackout.

== Impact ==
The blackout affected the operations of airports as well as forced the hospitals to use their backup generators. An inquiry was also conducted by National Electric Power Regulatory Authority (NEPRA) to probe the incident and imposed a fine of Rs50 million on the National Transmission and Despatch Company (NTDC). NEPRA stated the reason that the NTDC failed to ensure the supply of electricity in a timely manner.
