= Sukkur Electric Supply Company =

Pakistani electricity distribution company

- Type: Public utility
- Industry: Electric power
- Founded: July 2010, 26; 16 years ago
- Headquarters: Sukkur, Pakistan
- Key people: Mr. Saeed Ahmed Dawach Jamali (CEO)
- Website: sepco.com.pk

The Sukkur Electric Supply Company (SEPCO) is a public utility company operating in Pakistan, specifically serving the Sukkur region, that falls under the jurisdiction of the Pakistan Electric Power Company (PEPCO) and operates in compliance with regulations set by the National Electric Power Regulatory Authority (NEPRA). SEPCO's primary responsibility is the distribution and supply of electricity within its designated area.

== See also ==
- List of electricity distribution companies of Pakistan
