= Mepco =

MEPCO may refer to:

- Mepco Schlenk Engineering College
- Metal Powder Company
- Multan Electric Power Company
