= Hyderabad Electric Supply Company =

Electricity distribution company

- Type: Public utility
- Industry: Electric power
- Predecessor: Area Electricity Board Hyderabad
- Founded: April 23, 1998; 28 years ago
- Headquarters: Hyderabad, Pakistan
- Key people: Faizullah Dahri (CEO)
- Parent: PEPCO
- Website: hesco.gov.pk

Hyderabad Electric Supply Company (HESCO; Urdu: مشارکتِ برائے ترسیلِ برق حیدرآباد) is an electric distribution company that supplies electricity to the southern districts of Sindh in Pakistan, excluding Karachi.

Current CEO of the company is Faizullah Dahri

== Formation of the company ==
Hyderabad had an Area Electricity Board (AEB) as one of the eight AEBs constituted through amendments in WAPDA Act during 1981. Later on, as the Government of Pakistan approved the revamping of the Water and Power Development Authority (WAPDA) power sector in April 1998, the Hyderabad Electric Supply Company took over responsibilities of the Hyderabad Area Electricity Board. Hyderabad Electric Supply Company is owned and operated by WAPDA though. The company was incorporated on 23 April 1998 and certificate for commencement of business was obtained on 1 July 1998 from NEPRA under section 146(2) of Companies Ordinance 1984.

As a result of revamping, 12 corporate entities, 8 distribution companies (DISCOs), 3 generation companies (GENSCOs) and 1 National Transmission and Dispatch Company (NTDC) company were formed. Under 8 DISCOs, Area Electricity Board (AEB) Hyderabad was one of them. Therefore, HESCO - Hyderabad Electric Supply Company came in to formation. Formerly known as Area Electricity Board (AEBH) Hyderabad.

== See also ==
- List of electric supply companies in Pakistan
