= Energy Department (Punjab, Pakistan) =

Energy Department is a department of Government of Punjab, Pakistan. The department is responsible for regulation and policy formulation regarding power sector. After passing of 18th Amendment, provinces are fully powered to develop power projects through public or private sector.

The department is headed by Minister in charge democratically and a secretary at bureaucratic level, who is assisted by an additional secretary and four deputy secretaries.

== Power Projects ==
As of May 2012, there are more than 52 projects under development of around 1400 MW.

== Attached Departments ==
=== Punjab Power Development Board ===
Punjab Power Development Board (PPDB) provides One-Window facility to promote private sector participation in power generation.

=== Punjab Power Development Company Limited ===
Company to develop power projects in Public-Private Partnership.

=== Punjab Power Management Unit ===
Punjab Power Management Unit (PPMU) has been established to plan, procure and implement the ADB funded Renewable Energy Projects.

== See also ==
- Quaid-e-Azam Solar Park
- Ministry of Water and Power
- Electricity sector in Pakistan
- Energy policy of Pakistan
