= Electricity distribution companies of Pakistan =

Distribution companies (DISCOs) are companies operating under the Pakistan Electric Power Company (PEPCO). They are responsible for supplying electricity to the consumers living in their assigned areas. These companies help manage electricity supply, reduce line losses, and handle customer connections in their areas. They buy electricity from producers such as Water and Power Development Authority (WAPDA), GENCOs, PAEC, and other private Independent Power Producers (IPPs) and sell it to their respective area customers. All companies are owned by the Government of Pakistan except K-Electric, which was privatized in 2005.

== List ==
The following are the distribution companies (DISCOs) operating in Pakistan:

- Faisalabad Electric Supply Company (FESCO)
- Gujranwala Electric Power Company (GEPCO)
- Hazara Electric Supply Company (HAZECO)
- Hyderabad Electric Supply Company (HESCO)
- Islamabad Electric Supply Company (IESCO)
- K-Electric (Formerly known as Karachi Electric Supply Company). KE is Pakistan's Biggest and the only Power Utility Company to have both the Generation and the Distribution Capacity & Licenses.
- Lahore Electric Supply Company (LESCO)
- Multan Electric Power Company (MEPCO)
- Peshawar Electric Power Company (PESCO)
- Quetta Electric Supply Company (QESCO)
- Sukkur Electric Power Company (SEPCO)
- Tribal Electric Supply Company (TESCO)

== See also ==
- Electricity sector in Pakistan
- Alternative Energy Development Board
- National Electric Power Regulatory Authority (NEPRA)
- Electricity theft in Pakistan
