= Muhammad Rashid Siddiqui =

Pakistani footballer (born 1966)

Muhammad Rashid
Personal information
- Full name: Muhammad Rashid Siddiqui
- Date of birth: 7 January 1966 (age 60)
- Place of birth: Hyderabad, Pakistan
- Position: Midfielder

Youth career
- 1982–1986: Wazir Ali Industries

Senior career*
Years	Team	Apps	(Gls)
1986–1995	WAPDA		
1996	Pakistan Police		

International career
1992	Pakistan Youth		
1997	Pakistan	9	(0)
- * Club domestic league appearances and goals

Muhammad Rashid Siddiqui (Urdu: محمد راشد صدیقی) is a Pakistani former footballer who played as a midfielder. He represented the Pakistan national team during the 1990s.

== Early life ==
Rashid Siddiqui was born on 7 January 1966, in Hyderabad, Pakistan. He is the eldest of four brothers, his younger brother, Hayat-un-Nabi, also became a footballer. Rashid completed his schooling and inter-college education in Hyderabad, where he also began his footballing career as a forward before developing into a midfielder role.

== Club career ==
Siddiqui represented Hyderabad Division in the National Youth Championship in Karachi in 1986. His side reached the final but were defeated by, finishing as runners-up.

Siddiqui first came into prominence with Muhammad Club of Latifabad, where he played from 1982 to 1986. He later joined Hyderabad Club in 1986, and later joined departmental side WAPDA, where he became an influential player and also served as captain. He served as player and employee of the HESCO branch of WAPDA. During his time at the club, he helped them win the 1991 edition of the National Football Championship, playing a key role in their campaign. He also played at the 1991 Asian Club Championship. Siddiqui was also offered a contract with Pakistan Airlines, but he chose to remain with WAPDA. He then joined Pakistan Police, and also captained them on their tour to Nepal.

== International career ==
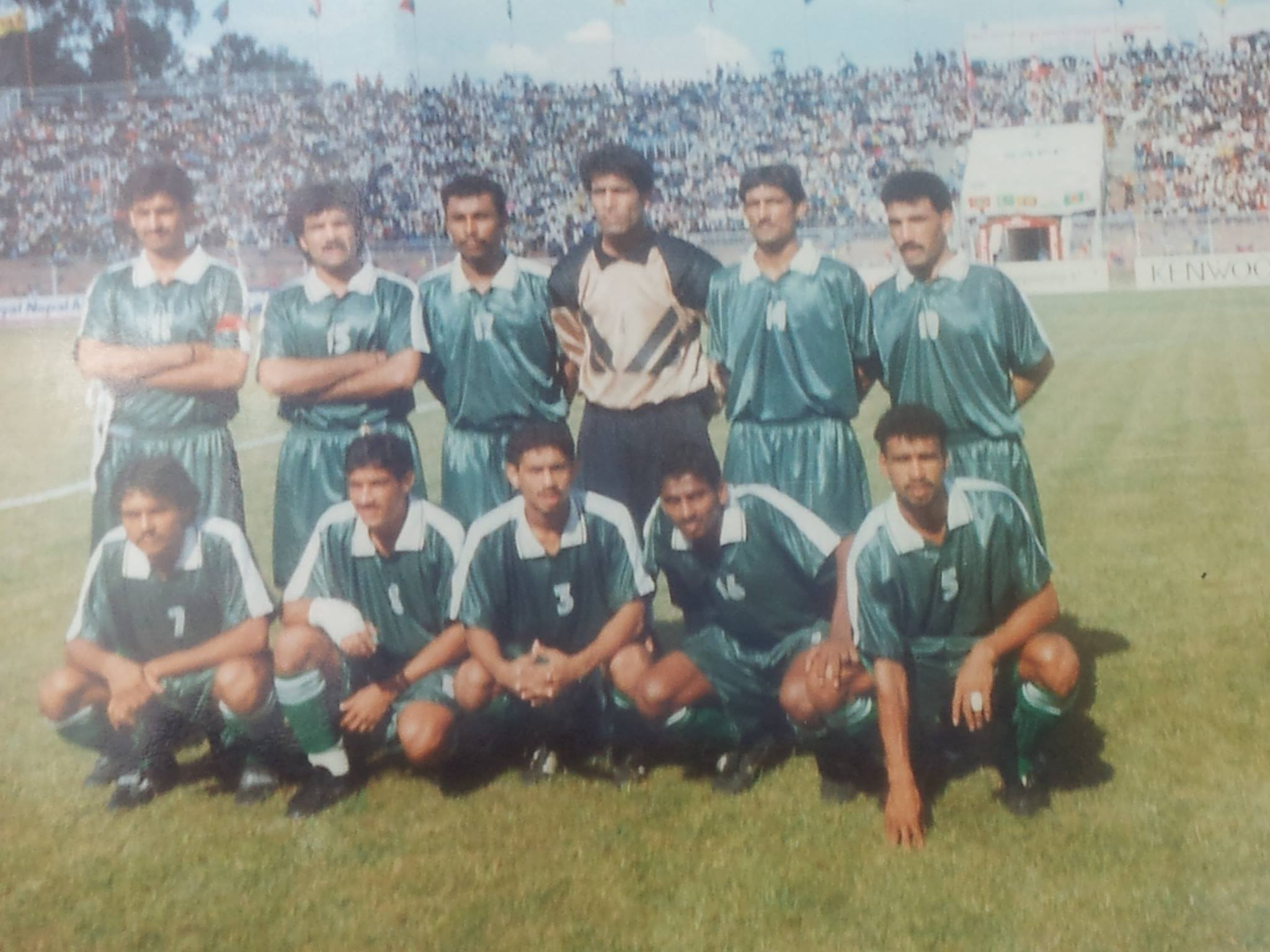
Siddiqui standing second from right side

Siddiqui played for the Pakistan Youth at youth level, at the 1992 Asian U-19 Championship Qualifiers. He was selected to play for the Pakistan national team for the 1997 SAFF Gold Cup. Under the captainship of Qazi Ashfaq, Siddiqui helped the team reach a third-place finish in the tournament, He was also present at the 1998 World Cup qualifiers.

== Post-retirement ==
After his retirement as player, Siddiqui undertook trainings to obtain a coaching license. In 2018, he was included in the selection committee for the Sindh team for the National Under-15 Football Tournament.

== Career statistics ==
=== International ===
Appearances and goals by national team and year
National team	Year	Apps	Goals
Pakistan	1997	8	0
Total		8	0

== Honours ==
=== WAPDA ===
- National Football Championship:
  - Winners (1): 1991
- National Games:
  - Winners (1): 1992

=== Pakistan ===
- SAFF Championship:
  - (bronze) third-place (1): 1997
