= Power Division (Pakistan) =

Division of the Government of Pakistan

- Seal of Government of Pakistan

Agency overview
- Formed: 1947; 79 years ago
- Jurisdiction: Government of Pakistan
- Headquarters: Block A, Pakistan Secretariat-I, Constitution Avenue, Islamabad, Pakistan
- Minister responsible: Awais Leghari, Minister of Energy
- Agency executive: Fakhr-e-Alam, Secretary of Power
- Parent department: Ministry of Energy
- Website: Official Website

The Power Division of the Ministry of Energy is an administrative and bureaucratic department to oversee the policy matters in electricity generation, grid transmission, and power distribution nationwide. The division was organized as a dedicated policy department with the inactivation of the Ministry of Water and Power in August 2017.

== Companies/ Divisions ==
=== National Transmission And Despatch Company ===
NTDC is a limited company established in 1998. The main function of the company is to purchase electric power from generation companies and then sell to distribution companies.

=== Private Power and Infrastructure Board ===
The Private Power and Infrastructure Board (PPIB) was created in 1994 to promote private sector participation in the power sector of Pakistan. PPIB facilitates investors in establishing private power projects and related infrastructure, executes Implementation Agreement (IA) with Project Sponsors and issues sovereign guarantees on behalf of government.

=== Power Information Technology Company (PITC) ===
PITC (Power Information Technology Company) is a leading public sector IT organization in Pakistan, operating under the Ministry of Energy (Power Division). It provides critical software solutions and IT support to power distribution companies (DISCOs), WAPDA, and NTDC. PITC manages large-scale billing systems, data analytics, and energy monitoring platforms, playing a vital role in modernizing Pakistan’s energy infrastructure. With its contributions to digital transformation, PITC is instrumental in improving efficiency and transparency in the power sector.

== See also ==
- List of power stations in Pakistan
- List of electric supply companies in Pakistan
- Electricity sector in Pakistan
- Energy policy of Pakistan
- Water resources management in Pakistan
- Energy Department (Punjab, Pakistan)
