= Kundal Dam =

Dam in Swabi, Khyber Pakhtunkhwa, Pakistan

Coordinates: 34.1959°N 72.5872°E

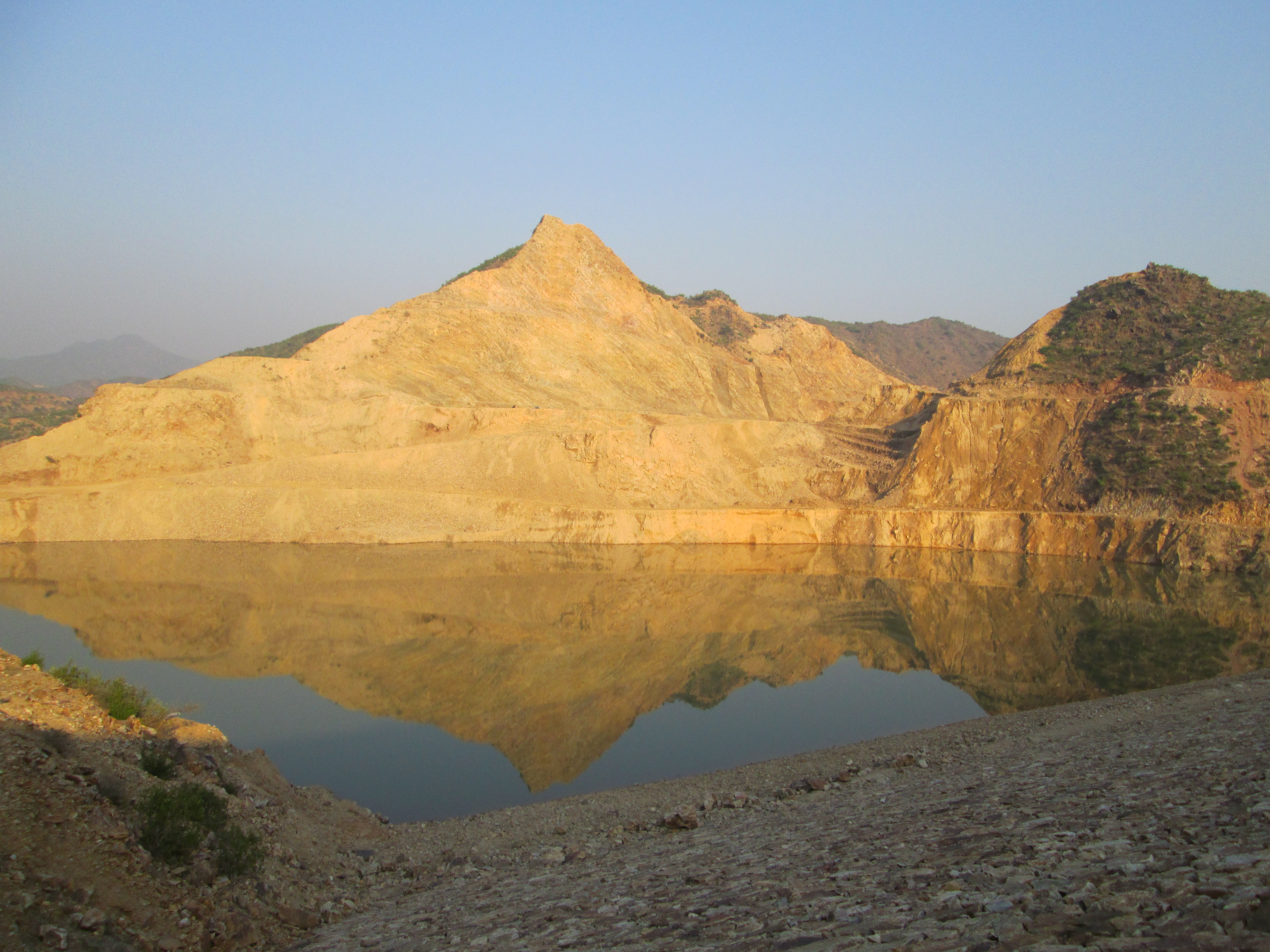
- a view of Kundal Dam
- Interactive map of Kundal Dam
- Official name: Kundal Dam
- Location: Swabi, Khyber Pakhtunkhwa
- Status: Construction Completed

Reservoir
- Total capacity: 14,499,579.2092866 m^{3} (11,755 acre⋅ft)

Kundal Dam is located in District Swabi, Khyber Pakhtunkhwa. The kundal dam will supply water for irrigation to fertile the barren land and control the floods as well as to fulfill water scarcity in the area. It will irrigate about 5398 hectares of land. The Dam is sponsored by the Ministry of Water and Power and Directorate General Small Dams, Irrigation Department, Government of Khyber Pakhtunkhwa are executing agencies of the kundal project.

Kundal dam is 48m high dam, having length 320m.Normal conservation level of the dam is 487.5a amsl. while dead level is 467m. it was designed by M/s consulting associates peshawar and Construction supervision was also made by them. Contractor was Sarwar and co. pvt. Irrigation system was designed by Engr Salah Ud Din. Irrigation system consist of three inverted syphon and many aqueduct and fall structures. Design capacity of main canal is 54 cusecs.

== See also ==
- List of dams and reservoirs in Pakistan
- List of power stations in Pakistan
- Tarbela Dam
