= Peshawar Electric Supply Company =

Power distribution company in Pakistan

PESCO
- Predecessor: AEB Peshawar, WAPDA
- Formation: March 22, 1998; 28 years ago
- Type: Public utility
- Headquarters: WAPDA House Peshawar, Pakistan
- CEO: Engr. Akhtar Hamid Khan
- Federal Secretary: Dr. Muhammad Fakhre Alam Irfan Power Secretary of Pakistan
- Jurisdiction: Government of Pakistan
- Parent organization: Ministry of Energy (Power Division)
- Website: pesco.com.pk

Peshawar Electric Supply Company (PESCO). (Urdu: مشارکتِ فراہمِ برقی پشاور ), is a state-owned public utility under the administrative control of the Government of Pakistan. Formerly part of the Power Wing of the Water and Power Development Authority (WAPDA), it is headquartered in Peshawar. PESCO is responsible for the distribution of electricity to more than 4.4 million consumers across the civil districts of Khyber Pakhtunkhwa, Pakistan, excluding the Hazara Division, and formerly the Federally Administered Tribal Areas (FATA).

== History ==
Water and Power Development Authority (WAPDA) was created in 1958 through WAPDA Act, 1958. Prior to this, the electricity supply service in Pakistan was undertaken by different agencies, both in public and private sectors, in different areas. The local areas electricity distribution service was being performed by various Regions of WAPDA. Then the Area Electricity Board (AEB) Peshawar, as a part of the eight AEBs in Pakistan, was established under the scheme of Area Electricity Boards in 1982, in order to provide more autonomy and representation to provincial government, elected representatives, industrialists, agriculturalists, and other interest groups in functions of the AEBs. Peshawar Area Electricity Board was reorganized into one such corporatized entity under the name of Peshawar Electric Supply Company (PESCO) in 1998, after the disbundling of the Water And Power Development Authority.

== Directorates ==
Each directorate is headed by an officer of the BPS-20 cadre, usually a Chief Engineer or Director General, and is organized into the following directorates and divisions:

- Admin & Services
- Audit Division
- Commercial Department
- Finance Department
- Grid Station Operations
- Human Resources
- Information Technology (IT) Directorate
- Legal & Labour
- MIS Directorate
- Material Management
- Operations Division
- Planning & Engineering Division
- Project Management Unit
- Project Construction
- Public Relations Directorate
- Technical Directorate

== Jurisdictions ==
The jurisdiction of PESCO extends to the whole of Khyber Pakhtunkhwa province, except for the Tribal Areas and Hazara Division, and is divided into seven circles, namely:

- Bannu circle.
- DI Khan circle.
- Khyber circle.
- Mardan circle.
- Peshawar circle.
- Swabi circle.
- Swat circle.

== See also ==
- List of electric supply companies in Pakistan
- Water & Power Development Authority
- Ministry of Energy (Power Division)
- Government of Pakistan
