= PRU Inter-Department Rugby Championship =

- Countries: Pakistan
- Champions: Pakistan Army
- Runners-up: WAPDA

The PRU (Pakistan Rugby Union) Inter-Department Rugby Championship is the annual domestic Rugby union competition played in Pakistan. It involves six of the country's state departments, and is one of the relatively few fifteens tournaments there, as most are played in the seven-a-side format.

The Pakistan Army are the current holders, having won 19–12 against WAPDA in the final of the 2011 edition.

== Teams ==
- Higher Education Commission (HEC)
- Pakistan Army
- Pakistan Navy
- Pakistan Police
- Pakistan Railways
- Water and Power Development Authority (WAPDA)
