= Electricity theft in Pakistan =

Illegal connection to the power grid

Electricity theft, also known as hooking, or kunda system in local language, is a chronic issue throughout Pakistan. Street protests in Pakistan for power outages and poor grid performance are common. Despite public pressure, the government of Pakistan has failed to resolve the issue, and has been criticised for its responses to victims of electricity supply shortages.

== Electricity theft ==
In 2013, it was declared in the Senate of Pakistan, that Pakistan had lost Rs90 billion (equivalent to ₨149.1 billion in 2021) in the last 5 years to electricity theft and line losses.

== Power supply to Karachi ==
K-Electric is a successor to KESC which was its original name for more than 70 years. It is integrated in generation, transmission and distribution to the whole Karachi city and its surroundings. Post 1990 it was placed under WAPDA control with the company's share price at Rs.160/- in stock market. According to the Pakistan Observer, WAPDA poorly managed KESC, resulting in its later privatisation.

=== Lack of access to power ===
According to estimates published in 2012-13, there were approximately 483 Katchi Abadis (informal settlements) in Karachi prior to 1990; residents of such localities do not have legal right to have civic facilities and basic living provisions such as electricity/water from government departments. According to the Chairman of Standing Committee on Urban Development of the Federation of Pakistan Chambers of Commerce & Industry, this has now grown to over 4,700 settlements.

=== Artificial reasons of theft ===
Many illegal ‘Kunda’ connections are overloading K-Electric's network, as well as causing financial losses. One method of getting electricity into the Kunda system is accessing a nearby area where timing of two neighborhoods are different for load shedding.

=== More consumption versus higher cost ===
One reason for electricity theft is that, whilst usage is increasing, costs have also risen. In 2009 a religious decree was issued in prohibiting theft of electricity.

== Anti-theft measures ==
In 2014 the President of Pakistan issued an ordinance defining punishments for electricity thieves, with context specific punishments.

K-Electric has introduced technologies that it says will remove "Kunda system and electricity theft". This program known as the Area Bundle Cable (ABC) System, has so far been installed in Kiamari area of Karachi and there are plans for the entire city is to be covered in the future.

== See also ==
- Theft of electricity
- Electricity sector in Pakistan
