= PRU Inter-Department Sevens Rugby Championship =

- Countries: Pakistan
- Champions: Pakistan Army
- Runners-up: WAPDA

The PRU (Pakistan Rugby Union) Inter-Department Sevens Rugby Championship is an annual domestic rugby competition played in Pakistan. It involves five of the country's state departments and as the name implies, is played according to the seven-a-side version of the game. The Pakistan Army are the current holders, having won 31–0 against WAPDA in the final of the 2011 edition.

== Teams ==
- Pakistan Army
- Pakistan Navy
- Pakistan Police
- Pakistan Railways
- Water and Power Development Authority (WAPDA)
