= Multan Electric Power Company =

Electric company in Pakistan

- مشارکتِ ملتان برائے ترسیلِ برق

Agency overview
- Formed: 1922: Multan Power Supply Company; 1998: Multan Electric Power Company
- Type: Power and Hydrology
- Jurisdiction: Federal Government of Pakistan
- Headquarters: Multan Electric Power Company, Multan, Pakistan
- Parent agency: Ministry of Energy (Pakistan)
- Website: www.mepco.com.pk

Multan Electric Power Company (MEPCO) (Urdu: مشارکتِ ملتان برائے ترسیلِ برق), formerly known as Multan Power Supply Company, is an electric distribution company which supplies electricity to thirteen districts of South Punjab, Pakistan. This company generates electric power from water (hydro-electric power) and distributes it to approximately thirty-four million people of the area. MEPCO is a licensee who has been granted a license by the NEPRA for the distribution of electricity exclusively to service territory spread over thirteen administrative districts of Southern Punjab.

== History ==
Multan Electric Power Company was founded as Multan Power Supply Company in 1922 during British India-era. In 1972, the company was nationalized. Subsequently, it was taken over by the Government of Pakistan. It was publicly listed on Karachi Stock Exchange until 1985 when it was de-listed from the exchange.

On 14 May 1998, Government of Pakistan decided to go with the corporatization of the energy sector in Pakistan. MEPCO was established to acquire all properties, rights, assets, obligations, and liabilities of the defunct Multan Area Electricity Board, grid stations, and transmission lines of the supply system. After 24 years of service in 2022, MEPCO has been directly and exclusively supplying electricity to 34 million people in 13 districts of South Punjab.

== Operations ==
MEPCO is the largest power distribution company in Pakistan operating exclusively in 13 administrative districts of southern Punjab i.e. Multan, Muzaffargarh, Layyah, Dera Ghazi Khan, Taunsa Sharif, Kot Addu, Tribal area of Dera Ghazi Khan, Fort Manro, Rajanpur, Lodhran, Jalalpur Pirwala, Bahawalpur, Rahim Yar Khan, Khanewal, Sahiwal, Pakpattan, Vehari and Bahawalnagar. MEPCO manages a complex transmission and distribution network of over 82,132 km of lines, 786 grid stations, and 672 feeders. In other words, it covers 50 constituencies of National Assembly of Pakistan and 104 constituencies of the Punjab Assembly.

The company's service territory is primarily rural, so its customer profile is heavily dominated by the domestic category and that too by lifeline customers.

== See also ==
- List of electric supply companies in Pakistan
- Pakistan Water & Power Development Authority (WAPDA)
- National Electric Power Regulatory Authority (NEPRA)
