= Machai Hydropower Plant =

- Interactive map of Machai Hydropower Plant
- Country: Pakistan
- Location: Machai Kalai, Mardan District, Khyber Pakhtunkhwa
- Coordinates: 34.4201°N 72.0455°E
- Purpose: Power
- Status: Operational
- Construction began: 2013
- Opening date: October 2017
- Owner: Government of Khyber Pakhtunkhwa

Dam and spillways
- Type of dam: Gravity dam
- Impounds: Machai Canal

Power Station
- Operator: WAPDA
- Commission date: October 2017
- Type: Run-of-the-river
- Turbines: 4
- Installed capacity: 2.6 MW

The Machai Hydropower Plant is a run-of-the-river hydroelectricity power station with a generating capacity of 2.6 MW. Construction of the damn crossing the Machai Canal began in 2013 and was completed in March 2015 at the cost of PKR 683.50 million.
