= List of eurobonds issued by Pakistan =

A eurobond is an international sovereign bond issued by the Government of Pakistan. As of April 2024, the total outstanding sovereign eurobonds of Pakistan stood at $5.8 billion.

== History ==
Pakistan issued its first eurobond in 1994.

In February 2004, a consortium led by ABN AMRO, Deutsche Bank, and JPMorgan arranged a $500 million five-year fixed-rate bond for the government, issued at par with a 6.75 percent coupon.

In March 2006, the Government of Pakistan selected Citigroup, Deutsche Bank, and JPMorgan to manage a new international bond issuance valued at $500 million.

In May 2021, Water and Power Development Authority, an organization administered by the Government of Pakistan, issued $500 million eurobond at a coupon rate of 7.5 percent to fund the construction of Diamer-Bhasha Dam and Mohmand Dam.

== List ==
Bond Issuance Details
Issued amount	Coupon	Tenor	Date	Status	Reference(s)
150 million	11.5 percent	5 years	1994	Tenor completed	
500 million	6.75 percent	5 years	2004	Tenor completed	
300 million	7.875 percent	30 years	30 March 2006	Due in March 2036	
500 million	7.125 percent	10 years	30 March 2006	Tenor completed	
750 million	6.875 percent	10 years	May 2007	Tenor completed	
1 billion	8.25 percent	10 years	8 April 2014	Tenor completed	
500 million	8.25 percent	10 years	24 September 2015	Tenor completed	
1.5 billion	6.875 percent	10 years	5 December 2017	Due in December 2027	
1 billion	5.875 percent	5 years	8 April 2021	Tenor completed	
1 billion	7.375 percent	10 years	8 April 2021	Due in April 2031	
500 million	8.875 percent	30 years	8 April 2021	Due in April 2051	
300 million	5.875 percent	5 years	7 July 2021	Due in July 2026	
400 million	7.375 percent	10 years	7 July 2021	Due in July 2031	
300 million	8.875 percent	30 years	7 July 2021	Due in July 2051	
