= Electricity sector in Nigeria =

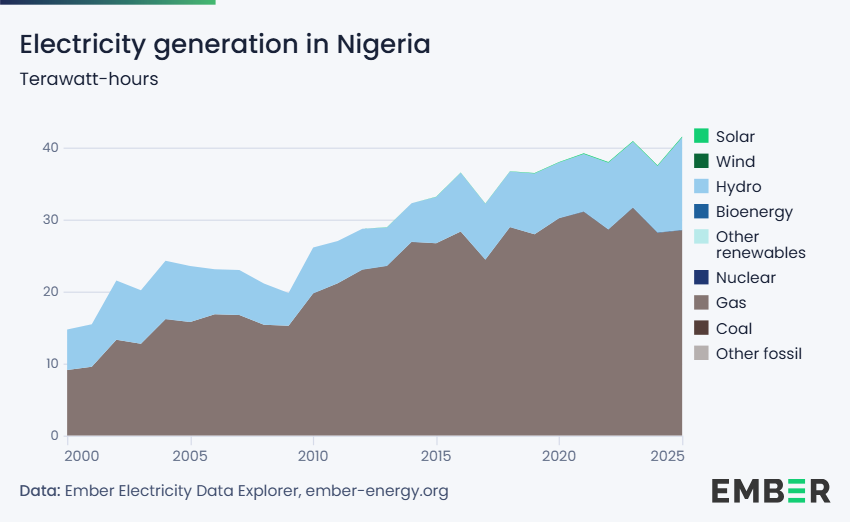
Electricity generation in Nigeria in terawatt-hours

The electricity sector in Nigeria generates, transmits and distributes megawatts (MW) of electric power that is significantly less than what is needed to meet basic household and industrial needs. Nigeria has 23 power-generating plants connected to the national grid with the capacity to generate 11,165.4 MW of electricity. These plants are managed by generation companies (GenCos), independent power providers, and Niger Delta Holding Company. In 2012, the industry labored to distribute 5,000 MW, very much less than the 40,000 MW needed to sustain the basic needs of the population. This deficit is also exacerbated by unannounced load shedding, partial and total system collapse and power failure. To meet demand, many households and businesses resort to purchasing generating sets to power their properties; this source of energy provided 6,000 MW in 2008. Nigeria has a chronic electricity shortage that has affected the country for many years. In 2022, its power grid collapsed twice in one week.

== Historical Background ==
=== Development of electric power industry ===
Electricity generation in Nigeria began in Lagos in 1886 with the use of generators to provide 60 kW. In 1923, tin miners installed a 2 MW plant on the Kwali River; six years later, the Nigerian Electricity Supply Company, a private firm, was established near Jos to manage a hydroelectric plant at Kura to power the mining industry. Then, another private enterprise was established in Sapele by United Africa Company to power the activities of the African Timber and Plywood Company. Between 1886 and 1945, electric power generation was relatively low, with power provided primarily to Lagos and other commercial centers such as mining industries in Jos and Enugu. The colonial government created an electricity department within the Public Works Department, which then installed generating sets in many cities to serve government reservation areas and commercial centers. In 1950, the Legislative Council of Nigeria began moves to integrate the electricity industry when it enacted a law to establish the Electricity Corporation of Nigeria (ECN) with the duties of developing and supplying electricity. ECN took over the electricity sector activities within PWD and the generating sets of Native Authorities. In 1951, the firm managed 46 MW of electricity. Between 1952 and 1960, the firm established coal-powered turbines at Oji and Ijora, Lagos. It began making preliminary plans for a transmission network to link the power-generating sites with other commercial centers. In 1961, ECN completed a 132 kV transmission line linking Lagos to Ibadan via Shagamu; in 1965, this line was extended to Oshogbo, Benin, and Ughelli to form the Western System.

In 1962, a statutory organization, the Niger Dams Authority (NDA), was formed to build and maintain dams along River Niger and Kaduna River, NDA went on to commission a 320 MW hydropower plant at Kainji in 1969, with the power generated sold to ECN. In 1972 NDA and ECN merged to form the National Electric Power Authority (NEPA). NEPA was the major electricity firm in Nigeria until power sector reforms resulted in the creation of the Power Holding Company of Nigeria (PHCN) and later the privatization of electricity generation and distribution.

== Generation ==
Electricity in Nigeria is generated through thermal and hydropower sources. The primary source of electricity generation comes from fossil fuels, especially gas, which accounts for 86% of the capacity in Nigeria, with the remainder generated from hydropower sources. Before the beginning of the Fourth Nigerian republic, power generation was mainly the federal government's responsibility through NEPA. However, reforms started in 2005 with the Electric Power Sector Reform Act (EPSRA) signing, which opened up the industry to private investors. In 2010, the Nigerian Bulk Electricity Trading Plc (NBET) was established as a credible off-taker of electric power generation companies. In 2014, the sector was privatized with three groups having the responsibility of providing power. By November 2013, the privatization of all generation and 11 distribution companies was completed, with the Federal Government retaining the ownership of the transmission company.

Month/Yr	Available capacity(MW)	Average daily generation
January 2018	7,457	3,744
February 2018	7,515	4,005
March 2018	7,475	4,079
April 2018	7,250	3,999
May 2018	8,034	3,827

=== Generation companies (GenCos) ===
Nigeria has 23 power-generating plants connected to the national grid with the capacity to generate 11,165.4 MW of electricity. These plants are managed by generation companies (GenCos), independent power providers, and Niger Delta Holding Company. The primary independent power plants before the power sector reforms are Shell-owned Afam VI (642 MW), Agip-built Okpai plant (480 MW), and AES (270 MW). The third sector is the Nigerian National Integrated Power Project, NIPP, a project that was initiated in 2004 to fast-track the development of new power plants in the country. The majority of the new proposed plants are gas-powered plants. In 2014, the proposed capacity of NIPP plants was 5,455 MW.

Company	Type	Capacity
Kainji Jebba Power Plc	Hydro	1,330MW
Ughelli Power Plc	Gas	942MW
Sapele Power Plc	Gas	1,020
Shiroro Power Plc	Hydro	600MW
Afam Power Plc	Gas	987.2MW
Niger Delta Power Holding Company	Gas	5,455
IPP's	Gas	1,392
Egbin Power Plc	Gas	1,020MW

=== Power supply deficit ===
Current electricity generated in Nigeria needs to be improved to meet the demand needs of households and businesses; as a result, Nigeria has a low per capita consumption of electricity, 109 kWh in 2006. Besides this deficit, between 1970 and 2009, available power plants operated below optimal levels, and electricity generated was lost in transmission. While electricity capacity was 5600 MW in 2001, the power generated fell as low as 1750 MW. The hydropower plants in Kainji, Shiroro, and Jebba tend to have higher capacity utilization rates, while the gas-powered plant was affected by infrastructural and maintenance issues. Between 1980 and 1996, the country witnessed a significant gap in electricity generated and electricity billed, which indicates electricity loss in transmission and theft from unauthorized connections. Since the coming of democracy in 1999, the loss ratio has reduced from 46.9% in 1996 to 9.4% in 2008. Vandalism of equipment, lack of proper maintenance of transformers, poor management, and corruption are a few of the reasons Nigeria has produced suboptimal electricity.

== Distribution ==
In Nigeria, electrical power generated by the GenCos is used to power the grid through the Transmission Company of Nigeria (TCN). Electricity is distributed through the transmission of electric power from TCN to the distribution companies (DisCos) primary substations, then to the secondary distribution system, and finally to the end consumers. Alternating Current (AC) is used for the transmission of electric power; this is because AC can be easily changed from one voltage to another with a slight loss of energy with the use of a transformer. The electric power is transmitted at high voltage (33 kV) to the DisCos' primary substations in the six geopolitical zones based on the load allocation formula. The high voltage received is then stepped down to medium voltage (11 kV) with the use of transformers. This medium voltage power is now transmitted to secondary distribution transformers near the consumer's residence. The secondary distribution transformers further step down the medium voltage to customers' consumption capacity (low voltage, usually 220 to 240V). However, some customers, for example, industries and commercial customers like Flour mills, Refineries, steel rolling mills, cement factories, rice mills, etc., may receive their power directly from the primary distribution line depending on their power utilization.

=== Distribution companies (DisCos) ===
Nigeria has eleven distribution companies.

Distribution company	Districts
Kaduna Electricity Distribution Company Plc	Kaduna including the districts of Makera, Doka, Birnin Kebbi, Gusau, Sokoto, and Zaria
Yola Electricity Distribution Company Plc	Yola, Maiduguri, Taraba, and Damaturu districts
Enugu Electricity Distribution Company Plc	Aba, Abakaliki, Abakpa, Awka, Ogui, Onitsha, Owerri, Nnewi, and Umuahia
Abuja Electricity Distribution Company Plc	Abuja, Minna, Suleja, Lokoja, and Lafia Districts
Ibadan Electricity Distribution Company Plc	Abeokuta, Dugbe, Molete, Ijebu-Ode, Osogbo, Ilorin, Sango-Ota, and Oyo
Jos Electricity Distribution Company Plc	Jos, Makurdi, Bauchi, and Gombe districts
Eko Electricity Distribution Company Plc	Festac, Ijora, Lagos Island, Ajah, and Badagry
Ikeja Electricity Distribution Company Plc	Ikeja, Shomolu, Akowonjo, Ikorodu, Oshodi and Abule-Egba
Port Harcourt Electricity Distribution Company Plc	Calabar, Diobu, Ikom/Ogoja, Borikiri, Uyo and Yenegoa
Benin Electricity Distribution Company Plc	Ado-Ekiti, Afenonesan, Akure, Asaba, Akpakpava, 'Ugbowo and Warri
Kano Electricity Distribution Company Plc	Nassarawa, Dala, Katsina, Dutse, Kumbotso, Funtua, and Dakata districts

DisCos are saddled with the following responsibilities; receiving energy from GenCos via TCN Plc, distributing energy to the end consumers, metering, billing of energy, revenue collection, revenue remittance to Nigeria Bulk Electricity Trading (NBET) Plc for energy received, remittance of revenue to TCN Plc for services provided, receiving complaints from customers, compliance to NERC's Service Level Agreements (SLAs), customers enlightenment ('Electricity Update') through local radio stations in the 36 states and the Federal Capital Territory (FCT) Abuja and load demand forecast.
