= Faisalabad Electric Supply Company =

Pakistani state-owned electric distribution company

Faisalabad Electric Power Supply Company
- Type: Public utility
- Industry: Electricity Distribution
- Founded: 1997; 29 years ago
- Headquarters: Faisalabad, Pakistan
- Area served: Central Punjab
- Key people: Engineer Abid Rasheed (CEO)
- Revenue: US$2.7 billion (2022)
- Owner: Government of Pakistan
- Number of employees: 13,000
- Website: fesco.com.pk

Faisalabad Electric Supply Company (FESCO) is a state-owned electric distribution company that supplies electricity to the districts of Faisalabad, Sargodha, Mianwali, Khushab, Jhang, Bhakkar, Toba Tek Singh, and Chiniot in Pakistan. This company generates electric power from water (hydro-electric power) and distributes it to 5.6 million consumers of the area.

Faisalabad Electric Supply Company was founded in 1998. Engineer Muhammad Aamir is its current CEO.

== See also ==
- List of electric supply companies in Pakistan
