= Hazara Electric Supply Company =

Pakistan electric utility company

- Company type: Government-owned
- Industry: Electric power distribution
- Founded: January 6, 2023; 2 years ago
- Headquarters: Abbottabad, Pakistan
- Area served: Hazara Division
- Products: Electricity
- Services: Electric power distribution
- Website: Official Website

Hazara Electric Supply Company (HAZECO) is an electric utility company of the Government of Pakistan. It was established on 6 January 2023, by Prime Minister Shehbaz Sharif, in response to the needs of the people residing in the Hazara region. HAZECO was formed as a separate Disco with bifurcation of Peshawar Electric Supply Company (PESCO).

The formation of HAZECO was authorized by Prime Minister Shehbaz Sharif to enhance the overall management of the Electricit Utility of Peshawar Electric Supply Company (PESCO), aiming to improve operational efficiency, reduce power losses, and enhance customer service. Following the Prime Minister's approval, PESCO was divided into two distinct companies: PESCO and HAZECO. PESCO comprises six circles, namely Peshawar District, Khyber District, Swat District, Bannu District, Mardan District, and Swabi District circles, while HAZECO consists of two circles: Hazara-I and Hazara-II Circles, with its headquarters located in Abbottabad.

Establishment of separate electric power company was a longstanding demand of people of Hazara.
