= Quetta Electric Supply Company =

Pakistani electricity distribution company

- Type: Public utility
- Industry: Electric power
- Founded: 1998; 28 years ago
- Headquarters: Quetta, Pakistan
- Key people: Engineer Shaukat Ali Jogezai (CEO)
- Website: qesco.com.pk

The Quetta Electric Supply Company (QESCO) is an electric distribution company which supplies electricity to the city of Quetta, Balochistan, Pakistan.

Mr. Shaukat Ali Jogezai serves as the current CEO of the company.

== History ==
Quetta Electric Supply Company was founded by a group of private investors in 1928 during British India-era. The history of the company goes back to 1891, when two DC generators were erected to supply power to Quetta Staff College, became the first city in what is now Pakistan to have an electric supply. It was publicly listed on Karachi Stock Exchange until 1981 when it was de-listed from the exchange.

== Area of Services Provision ==
QESCO is the biggest power transmission company and covers almost 43% of Pakistan’s area. But due to the low population, it has the least consumers compared to other power distribution companies in Pakistan. QESCO provides the electricity supply in the whole of Balochistan except the Lasbela district which is getting power from K- Electric. The following districts are getting power supply from QESCO

Awaran	Barkhan	Bolan	Chaghi
Dera Bugti	Jafarabad	Jhal Magsi	Kalat
Kech	Kharan	Khuzdar	Kohlu
Lorlai	Mastung	Musa Khel	Naseerabad
Naushki	Panjgur	Pishin	Qilla Abdullah
Qilla Saifullah	Quetta	Sibbi	Sherani
Ziarat	Zhob	Surab	Dukki

== See also ==
- List of electric supply companies in Pakistan
