= Gujranwala Electric Power Company =

Electric distribution company in Punjab, Pakistan

- Company type: Public utility
- Industry: Electric power
- Founded: 25 April 1998; 28 years ago
- Headquarters: Gujranwala, Pakistan
- Owner: Government of Pakistan
- Number of employees: 11,343 (2024)
- Website: http://www.gepco.com.pk/

Gujranwala Electric Power Company (GEPCO; Urdu: بجلی ترسیلِ کمپنی گوجرانوالہ) is an electric distribution company which supplies electricity to the Gujranwala region in Punjab, Pakistan. The jurisdiction of the company includes Sialkot, Narowal, Gujranwala, Gujrat, Hafizabad, Wazirabad and Mandi Bahauddin districts. The current Chief Executive Officer of GEPCO is Engineer Muhammad Ayub.

== See also ==
- List of electric supply companies in Pakistan
