= Energy in Yemen =

Electricity generation in Yemen in terawatt-hours

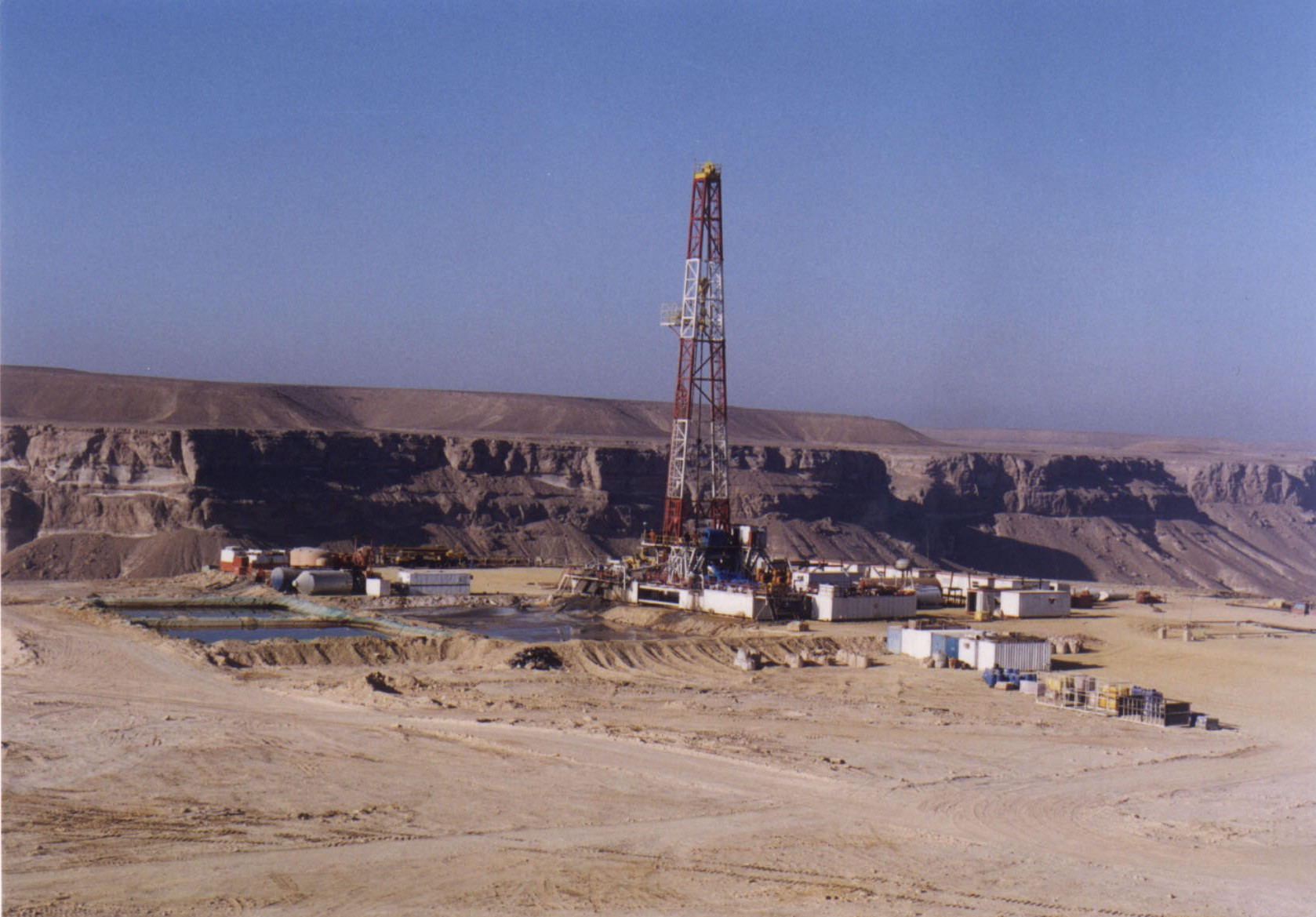
Oil drilling in Yemen

Energy in Yemen describes energy and electricity production, consumption and import in Yemen. Yemen is net energy exporter.

Primary energy use in Yemen was 87 TWh and 4 TWh/million people in 2008 and 88 TWh (4 TWh/M) in 2009.

== Overview ==
According to the World Bank, Yemen has the lowest level of electricity connection in the Middle East, with only 40% of the population having access to electricity. Rural areas are particularly badly affected. Industrial concerns, hospitals and hotels have their own back-up generators. To address these shortages, a 340-MW gas-fired power plant is under construction-and close to completion-at Marib. Further expansion to the facility, which will add an additional 400 MW of output, is planned. Yemen has received considerable support for the development of its power generation network in recent years, with contributions coming from Saudi Arabia, France, the US, as well as multilateral donors such as the World Bank. Consequently, a National Rural Electrification Program is now in place and the construction of three substations, along with the necessary transmission lines, is under way. Yemen is also looking into the development of wind power, although plans for the construction of a nuclear power generating facility have been shelved. Electrical production was 5.665 billion kWh (2007 estimate). Electrical consumption was about 4.133 billion kWh.

Energy in Yemen
	Capita	Prim. energy	Production	Export	Electricity	CO_{2}-emission
	Million	TWh	TWh	TWh	TWh	Mt
2004	20.33	74	240	153	3.36	17.26
2007	22.38	84	192	102	4.50	20.55
2008	23.05	87	177	92	5.04	21.93
2009	23.58	88	177	93	5.11	22.18
2010	24.05	83	230	139	5.98	21.65
2012R	23.85	80.5	176	94	4.23	19.97
2013	24.41	96.2	212	114	6.31	23.92
Change 2004-10	18.3%	12.6%	-4.1%	-9.1%	78.0%	25.4%
Mtoe = 11.63 TWh, Prim. energy includes energy losses. 2012R = CO2 calculation criteria changed, numbers updated

Yemen population increased 16.0% in five years 2004–2009. According to OECD/World Bank population growth in Yemen was from 20 million to 24 million in 6 years (2004–2010).

== Business ==
Yemen LNG (YLNG) is the first Liquefied natural gas (LNG) project in Yemen.

== See also ==
- Economy of Yemen#Oil and gas
- Economy of Yemen#Electricity
