= Alternative Energy Development Board =

Government Agency in Pakistan

- AEDB هیئت متبادل توانائی ترقی
- Official logo

Agency overview
- Formed: May 2003
- Dissolved: 2023
- Superseding agency: Private Power and Infrastructure Board
- Jurisdiction: Government of Pakistan
- Headquarters: Islamabad
- Website: Private Power & Infrastructure Board

The Alternative Energy Development Board (AEDB) (Urdu: هیئت متبادل توانائی ترقی) was an agency of the Federal Government established in May 2003 with the main objective to facilitate, promote and encourage development of renewable energy in Pakistan and with a mission to introduce alternative and renewable energy at an accelerated rate. The administrative control of AEDB was transferred to Ministry of Water and Power in 2006.

The Government of Pakistan had inter alia mandated AEDB to:-

- Implement policies, programs, and projects through the private sector in the field of ARE
- Assist and facilitate development and generation of ARE to achieve sustainable economic growth
- Encourage transfer of technology and develop indigenous manufacturing base for ARE Technology
- Promote provision of energy services that are based on ARE resources
- Undertake ARE projects on commercial scale (AEDB Act 2010)

The Government of Pakistan had tasked the AEDB to ensure 5% of total national power generation capacity to be generated through renewable energy technologies by 2030. In addition, under the remote village electrification program, AEDB has been directed to electrify 7,874 remote villages in Sindh and Balochistan provinces through ARE technologies.

The Federal Government established AEDB as a statutory organization by announcing and promulgating the AEDB Act in May 2010. The Act bestowed upon AEDB the authorities and the responsibilities for the promotion and development of alternative and renewable energy.

Although, the AEDB is administrated through the appointed chairman and chief executive officer; all policies and funding research is overseen by the Prime Minister.

The organization's progress is being heard and examined in the Supreme Court of Pakistan.

On 10 June 2023, AEDB was merged with Private Power and Infrastructure Board (PPIB).

== See also ==
- List of electric supply companies in Pakistan
- Electricity in Pakistan
- Electricity sector in Pakistan
- List of electric supply companies in Pakistan
- Water and Power Development Authority
- Economy of Pakistan
- Water and Power Development Authority
- National Electric Power Regulatory Authority
- Karachi Electric Supply Company
