= Tribal Electric Supply Company =

Electric distribution company to Merged Tribal Districts

Tribal Electric Power Supply Company
- Company type: Public utility
- Industry: Electric power
- Founded: 2004; 22 years ago
- Headquarters: Peshawar, Pakistan
- Website: tesco.gov.pk

Tribal Electric Supply Company (TESCO) (Urdu: مشارکتِ برائے ترسیلِ برق ، قبائلی علاقہ جات) is an electric distribution company which supplies electricity to FATA (present-day Merged Tribal Districts), Pakistan.

== See also ==
- List of electric supply companies in Pakistan
