= Metal Powder Company =

The Metal Powder Company Limited (MEPCO) is situated at Thirumangalam in Madurai district in southern part of Tamil Nadu, India. Established in 1961 and commercial production started in 1965. It manufactures non-ferrous metal powders of various kinds like aluminium, copper, zinc, cobalt, tungsten, tin, etc. They also manufacture alloys of copper, zinc, etc.

They sell to a wide range of industries like fireworks, paint, printing ink, mining explosives, ordnance, space, cutting tools, brake linings etc.

The turnover exceeded Rs.200cr in the financial year 2007 - 08.

The Mepco Schlenk trust is the social welfare trust of this company which has formed the prestigious Mepco Schlenk Engineering College at Sivakasi.
