= Islamabad Electric Supply Company =

Pakistani public utility

- Type: Public utility
- Industry: Electric power
- Founded: 1923: Rawalpindi Electric Power Company; 1998: Islamabad Electric Supply Company
- Headquarters: Islamabad, Pakistan
- Key people: Engr. Khalid Mahmood (CEO)
- Website: iesco.com.pk

Islamabad Electric Supply Company (IESCO) is an electric utility company in Islamabad, incorporated in 1998. It is under the ownership of the Government of Pakistan.

== Background ==
=== 1923–1985: Rawalpindi Electric Power Company ===
Islamabad Electric Supply Company was founded as Rawalpindi Electric Power Company (REPCO) in 1923 during British India-era. In 1972, the company was nationalized and subsequently was taken over by the Government of Pakistan. It was publicly listed on Karachi Stock Exchange until 1985 when it was de-listed from the exchange.

=== 1998–present:Islamabad Electric Supply Company ===
IESCO was formed in 1998 to take over the assets, functions and responsibilities of the erstwhile Islamabad Area Electricity Board, which was then a division of WAPDA. It distributes and sell electricity in the area from Attock to Jhelum, and from the river Indus to River Neelum in Kashmir.

== Management ==
IESCO is structured into several administrative circles, each managed by different levels of engineering staff to ensure efficient operations and high customer satisfaction. The company operates with 108 Grid Stations with a total capacity of 5,224 MVA and distributes power through 951 Feeders, including distribution to AJK.
