= Power Secretary of Pakistan =

Administrative post of the Ministry of Energy

- معتمدِ توانائی پاکستان
- Appointer: Prime Minister of Pakistan
- Website: Power Division

The Power Secretary of Pakistan (Urdu: معتمدِ توانائی پاکستان) is the Federal Secretary for the Ministry of Energy (Power Division). The position holder is a BPS-22 grade officer, usually belonging to the Pakistan Administrative Service.

== See also ==
- Government of Pakistan
- Federal Secretary
- Interior Secretary of Pakistan
- Cabinet Secretary of Pakistan
- Finance Secretary of Pakistan
- Petroleum Secretary of Pakistan
