= Generation company =

Generation companies (often abbreviated as GenCos or GENCOs) are entities within the deregulated electric power industry that own and operate power plants. In a restructured power system, these companies compete to sell the electricity they produce, typically operating as independent entities distinct from transmission (performed by transmission owners, TO) and distribution (done by DISCOs also known as DISTCOs) functions. While the GenCo might not own the generation equipment it uses, the term generator owner (GO) is frequently used as a synonym.

Following the deregulation of the power industry, the traditional vertically integrated utility structure was unbundled to foster competition. This restructuring process separated the generation of electricity from its delivery, allowing generation companies to compete for customers in an open electricity market.

== See also ==
- Electricity retailing

== Sources ==
- David, A. K.; Wen, Fushuan (2001). "Transmission Open Access". In Lai, Loi Lei (ed.). Power System Restructuring and Deregulation: Trading, Performance and Information Technology. John Wiley & Sons. pp. 172–217. ISBN 978-0-471-49500-0.
- Kennedy, Barry W. (2000). Power Quality Primer. McGraw-Hill Professional. ISBN 978-0-07-136284-9.
- Olson, Mark A.; Rassenti, Stephen; Smith, Vernon L. (2008). "Chapter 73: Energy, Reserve and Adjustment Market Behavior With Industry Network, Demand and Generator Parameters". In Plott, Charles R.; Smith, Vernon L. (eds.). Handbook of Experimental Economics Results. Vol. 1. Elsevier. pp. 681–699. doi:10.1016/S1574-0722(07)00073-X. ISBN 978-0-444-82642-8.
