= Central Power Purchasing Agency =

Pakistani Energy Market Operator

- Formation: 2015
- Type: Government-owned
- Location: Islamabad, Pakistan
- Website: www.cppa.gov.pk

Central Power Purchasing Agency-Guarantee (CPPA-G) is the market operator in Pakistan and is facilitating the power market transition from the current single buyer to a competitive market.

It was established in 2015 and was separated from the National Transmission & Despatch Company.

Central Power Purchasing Agency (CPPA-G) is a Company incorporated under the Companies Ordinance, 1984 and wholly owned by the Government of Pakistan (the “GOP”). Since June 2015, CPPA-G has assumed the business of National Transmission and Dispatch Company (the “NTDC”) pertaining to the market operations and presently functioning as the Market Operator in accordance with Rule-5 of the NEPRA Market Operator (Registration, Standards and Procedure) Rules, 2015 (the “Market Rules”).
