= Pakistan Electric Power Company =

Holding company in electricity sector of Pakistan

- Type: State-owned enterprise
- Industry: Electric power
- Founded: 1998
- Headquarters: Islamabad, Pakistan
- Products: Electricity distribution coordination and management
- Services: Oversight of distribution companies (DISCOs)
- Owner: Government of Pakistan
- Parent: Ministry of Energy (Power Division)

Pakistan Electric Power Company (Urdu: پاکستان برقی توانائی شرکت), colloquially known as PEPCO, is a holding company that monitor's and coordinates Pakistan's Distribution Companies (DISCOs) and used to operate as a division of the Ministry of Water and Power (Pakistan).

== History ==
PEPCO was incorporated in 1998 in pursuance of the “Strategic Plan for Restructuring of Pakistan Power Sector” to facilitate the transition process in WAPDA power wing and effective corporatization of new entities after unbundling of WAPDA. In pursuance of this mandate, PEPCO signed a memorandum of agreement (MoA) with WAPDA for a period of 2 years. In its defined role, PEPCO is responsible for assisting the Ministry of Energy (Power Division), Government of Pakistan in effectively monitoring and oversight of the Distribution Companies (DISCOs)

In 2000, WAPDA transferred power distribution companies to Pakistan Electric Power Company (PEPCO) under a reorganization plan of power sector in Pakistan.

Ten years after its initial dissolution, PEPCO was reinstated in 2020 as a "Managing Agent" of utility distribution companies in Pakistan.

In 2021, the headquarters of PEPCO relocated to Islamabad from Lahore, and it was decided to rename it as Power Planning and Monitoring Company.

== Subsidiaries ==
The following companies came under PEPCO:

- Distribution companies (DISCOs)
- Generation companies (GENCOs)
- Power Information Technology Company
