= National Grid Company of Pakistan =

Pakistani power transmission company

- Type: State-owned enterprise
- Founded: 1998
- Headquarters: Lahore, Punjab, Pakistan
- Website: www.ntdc.gov.pk

The National Grid Company of Pakistan (NGC) formerly known as National Transmission & Despatch Company (NTDC) is a public power transmission company in Pakistan managed by the Ministry of Energy.

== History ==
In 1998 the National Transmission & Despatch Company was separated from Water & Power Development Authority (WAPDA) and operates fourteen 500 KV and forty-three 220 KV grid stations, 5893 km of 500 KV transmission lines, and 10963 km of 220 KV transmission lines in Pakistan. Its present headquarters are located at WAPDA House, Lahore, Pakistan.

In 1985, National Power Control Center (NPCC) was established in Islamabad to control 500kV and 220kV transmission system under eight Regional Control Centers (RCC). In 2024 the Government of Pakistan announced the splitting of the NPCC from the NTDC, saying it would have its own Board of Directors.

In November 2024, the Federal Cabinet approved the dissolution of the NTDC into three entities; the Independent System Market Operator (ISMO), the National Grid Company (NGC), and the Energy Infrastructure and Development Management Company (EIDMC).
