= Electricity sector in Pakistan =

Overview of the electric sector of Pakistan

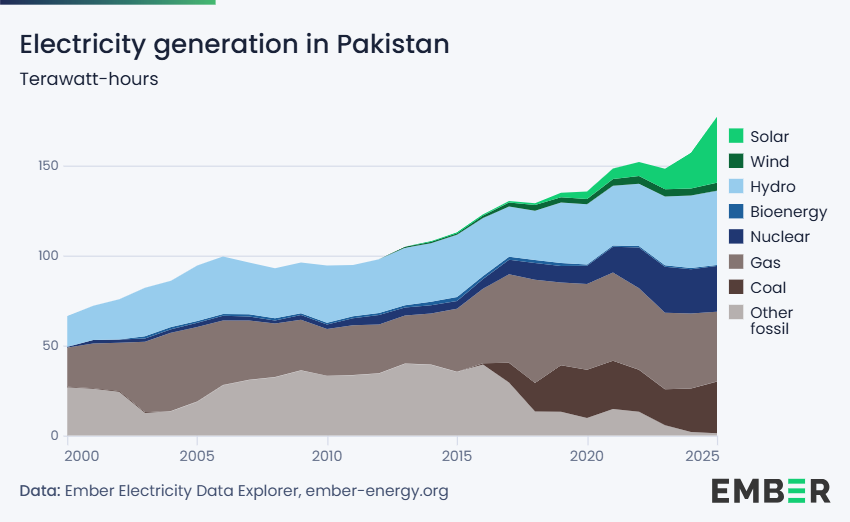
Electricity generation in Pakistan in terawatt-hours

Electricity in Pakistan is generated, transmitted and distributed by two vertically integrated public sector companies, the first one being Water and Power Development Authority (WAPDA) responsible for the production of hydroelectricity and its supply to the consumers by electricity distribution companies (DISCOS) under the Pakistan Electric Power Company (PEPCO) being the other integrated company. Currently, there are 12 distribution companies and a National Transmission And Dispatch Company (NTDC) which are all in the public sector except Karachi Electric operating in the city of Karachi and its surrounding areas. There were around 36 independent power producers (IPPs) that contribute significantly to the electricity generation in Pakistan. As of 2025, the Government of Pakistan is focusing to re-structure the agreements with IPPs and facilitate the end users.

As of 2022, 95% of Pakistan's population had access to electricity. Pakistan aims to generate 60% of its electricity from renewable sources, and has set targets for reduction in greenhouse gas emissions. It is already facing a 'solar boom', adding an estimated 17 GW worth of clean solar energy to the grid in 2024 alone, partly due to availability of cheap Chinese solar panels and tax exemptions from the government.

Following the 2022 dearth of imported LNG in Pakistan, the country indicated it would quadruple its coal power plants, which use domestic coal. Electricity generation capacity from coal has seen significant growth in recent years, owing to the use of cheap domestic coal to meet the country's rising electricity demands. The frequent increases in electricity, natural gas, petrol, and diesel prices are substantial contributors, driving inflation and consequently decreasing industrial production.

== History ==
Pakistan's electricity sector is a developing market. For years, the matter of balancing the country's supply against the demand for electricity had remained a largely unresolved matter. The country faced significant challenges in revamping its network responsible for the supply of electricity. Electricity generators were seeking a parity in returns for both domestic and foreign investors indicating it to be one of the key issues in overseeing a surge in electricity generation when the country was facing growing shortages. Other problems included lack of efficiency, rising demands for energy, and political instability. Provincial and federal agencies, who are the largest consumers, often do not pay their bills. At one point electricity generation had shrunk by up to 50% due to an over-reliance on fossil fuels. The country was hit by its worst power crisis in 2007 when production fell by 6000 MW and massive blackouts followed suit. Load shedding and power blackouts had become severe in Pakistan before 2016. Economic Survey of 2020-21 indicated that Pakistan's installed capacity to generate electricity had surged up to 37,261 MW by July 2020, which stood at 22,812 MW in June 2013, showing the growth of 64% over 7 years.

== Installed capacity ==
According to the Pakistan Economic Survey 2025–26, the installed electricity generation capacity reached 49,651 MW in March 2026, reflecting an increase of 8.45% from previous year. The electricity transmission network, currently, has the capacity to handle more than 53,000 MVA. In FY 2025, Pakistan generated 126,705 GWh of electricity, of which 53.7% was generated from hydro, nuclear or renewable energy sources.

Installed capacity by source in MW, March 2026:
1. Fossil fuels: 24,405 (49.2%)
2. Hydroelectric: 11,615 (23.4%)
3. Nuclear: 3,530 (7.11%)
4. Renewable: 10,101 (20.3%)

Pakistan’s power sector continues to face significant challenges, with underutilization of generation capacity remaining a core issue despite recent renegotiations of independent power producers’ (IPPs) power purchase agreements. In the 9 months of July-March 2026, Pakistan has added 4.5 GW of capacity on the grid alone from domestic solar net metering.

Installed capacity & electricity generation as of FY2025-26
Source	Installed capacity (March 2026)		Electricity generation (FY 2025)	
Source	MW	Share (%)	GWh	Share (%)
Fossils	24,405	49.2	58,580	46.2
Hydro	11,615	23.4	39,973	31.5
Renewable	10,101	20.3	5,700	4.5
Nuclear	3,530	7.1	22,452	17.7
Total	49,651		126,705	

== Electricity consumption ==
The country’s overall power consumption increased by 3.8% in FY 2025. Total electricity consumption stood at 113,140 GWh, of which the sector-wise share is as follows:

Electricity consumption in FY2025
Source	GWh	Share (%)	Change from FY2024 (GWh)
Household	57,455	50.8	2,544
Industry	29,181	25.8	1,351
Commercial	9,721	8.6	526
Agriculture	5,882	5.2	(2,696)
Others	10,901	9.6	305
Total:	113,140		2,030

== Governance and sector reform ==
Recent reforms include the unbundling and corporatization of the Water and Power Development Authority (WAPDA) into 10 regional distribution companies, four government-owned thermal power generation companies and a transmission company, the National Transmission and Despatch Company. The hydropower plants were retained by WAPDA as WAPDA Hydroelectric. All are fully owned by the government. K-Electric Limited (formally known as Karachi Electric Supply Company), which is responsible for power generation and distribution in the Karachi area, is listed on the stock exchanges and is privately owned. Privately owned independent power producers generated 53% of the country's power in FY2016.

In 2019, the Alternative and Renewable Energy policy was introduced to promote renewable energy in the country and reduce carbon footprint and greenhouse gas emissions. The policy aimed to increase share of green energy to 20% by 2025 and 30% by 2030. As of FY2024, only 6.25% of installed capacity of electricity in Pakistan was from renewables.

=== Reform-induced shift to solar power ===
Cracks in Pakistan's power system—marked by rising electricity prices, frequent outages, and structural inefficiencies—had led many consumers to adopt solar energy. The shift was driven in part by 1990s-era reforms that locked the government into long-term contracts with independent power producers, requiring payments regardless of consumption. As electricity became increasingly unaffordable and unreliable, households and businesses turned to solar to cut costs. The resulting drop in grid demand strained the power sector’s financial model, as fixed payments were spread across a shrinking base of consumers. However, the government's 2025 decision to impose a 10% tax on imported solar panels risked slowing adoption among lower- and middle-income households, who were already burdened by rising electricity costs. Critics warned the move could worsen energy inequality, as wealthier users remained shielded by earlier solar investments while poorer consumers faced growing financial pressure.

=== Subsidy reforms ===
To meet loan conditions set by the International Monetary Fund (IMF), the Pakistani government undertook major energy subsidy reforms. These reforms were a key requirement for securing over $10 billion in IMF financial assistance during the preceding decade. As subsidies were rolled back, electricity prices more than doubled between 2022 and 2025, placing a significant burden on households and businesses. For example, in 2024, the Punjab government decided to withdraw the Rs14 per unit electricity subsidy for consumers in Islamabad Capital Territory (ICT). The federal government had raised electricity prices by up to 51% as part of the IMF’s loan program. The affordability crisis was further intensified by the depreciation of the Pakistani rupee and global energy price volatility. At the same time, Pakistan's aging electricity grid—plagued by outdated infrastructure and unreliable distribution systems—struggled to cope with growing demand. Frequent power outages and occasional nationwide blackouts became more common. These systemic failures were further exposed during increasingly severe heat waves.

== Effects of natural and man-made disasters ==
During 2010 Pakistan floods and 2005 Kashmir earthquake power stations, power distribution and transmission and other energy infrastructures were damaged. During the floods and rainfalls the recently constructed Jinnah hydroelectric power plant was flooded in addition to severe damages to transmission and distribution network and installations while several power plants and refineries were threatened by rising waters and had to be shut down. Natural gas field output had to be reduced as the flood waters approached the wells. There has also been some concern by Pakistani nuclear activists over the effect of natural disasters on nuclear plants specially over the Chashma Nuclear Power Plant, since the plant lies over a geological fault. Due to over reliance of Pakistan on dams for electricity generation, some environmental impacts of dams such as submergence of usable/ecological land and their negative impact on Pakistan's mangrove forests due to loss of river silt load, as well as increased risk of severe floods have become evident.

== See also ==
- List of power stations in Pakistan
- List of electricity distribution companies of Pakistan
- Water & Power Development Authority
- Economy of Pakistan
- Pakistan Electric Power Company
- Alternative Energy Development Board
- National Electric Power Regulatory Authority
- Karachi Electric Supply Company
- Pakistan national energy policy
- Private Power and Infrastructure Board (PPIB)
