= K-Electric =

Public energy utility in Pakistan

K-Electric Limited
- Formerly: Karachi Electric Supply Corporation Limited (1913–2002); Karachi Electric Supply Company Limited (2002–2013)
- Traded as: PSX: KEL; KSE 100 component
- Industry: Energy
- Founded: September 1913; 113 years ago
- Headquarters: KE House, DHA, Karachi-75500
- Area served: Karachi, Sindh, Pakistan
- Key people: Shaheryar Chishty (Chairman); Syed Muhammad Taha (CEO)
- Services: Electricity Generation, Transmission & Distribution
- Revenue: ▲ Rs. 519.47 billion (US$1.9 billion) (2023)
- Operating income: ▼ Rs. 52.81 billion (US$190 million) (2023)
- Net income: ▼ Rs. -30.89 billion (US$−110 million) (2023)
- Total assets: ▼ Rs. 1.02 trillion (US$3.6 billion) (2023)
- Total equity: ▲ Rs. 255.15 billion (US$910 million) (2023)
- Number of employees: 9,589 (2023)
- Website: ke.com.pk

K-Electric Limited (formerly the Karachi Electric Supply Corporation and the Karachi Electric Supply Company, KESC) is a Pakistani electric utility that generates, transmits, and distributes electricity in Karachi, Pakistan, and adjoining areas of Sindh and Balochistan. It is based in Karachi and listed on the Pakistan Stock Exchange.

== History ==
=== Founding and early years (1913–1947) ===
In the early 1910s, M. de P. Webb of the Karachi firm Forbes, Forbes, Campbell & Co. studied a public electricity supply for the city with the electrical contractors Crompton & Co., and the firm applied for a licence under the Indian Electricity Act of 1910. The Government of Bombay granted the licence on August 27, 1913, and the Karachi Electric Supply Corporation Limited, formed to take over its rights, was registered on September 13, 1913, with an authorised capital of Rs 1 million. The whole of its capital was subscribed in British India, and Indians held seven of the nine seats on its board. Forbes, Forbes, Campbell & Co. served as its managing agents.

The company's first power station, on Elander Road, supplied direct current from Crompton dynamos driven by three diesel engines from Mirrlees, Bickerton & Day, two of 240 bhp and one of 100 bhp. The Commissioner in Sind opened it on February 1, 1915, and the company also agreed with the municipality to light the city's streets with about 500 lamps. By 1923, the station ranked second in size among India's all-diesel power stations.

By early 1931, the managing agency had passed to United Eastern Agencies Ltd of Bombay. In March 1931, the American & Foreign Power Company of the United States bought a majority of United Eastern Agencies and it also took a half interest in KESC itself. United Eastern Agencies were still the managing agents in 1940s. The oldest units of the company's steam station at West Wharf, in the Karachi docks, were installed in 1946. At the Partition of India in August 1947, its installed capacity was 8,280 kW.

=== Government control (1947–2005) ===
In 1949, KESC became the first company in Pakistan to have its shares quoted on a stock exchange. In 1951, a newly formed and privately financed company, Pakistan Electric Agencies Ltd, became the managing agents under a 20-year agreement dated March 31, 1951. In 1952, KESC could not raise private funding for an expansion, so the central government bought Rs 17.5 million of newly issued shares, giving it a 72 percent controlling interest. It also bought Pakistan Electric Agencies from its owners, but not their shares in KESC. By 1955, the government nominated ten of the twelve board members, including the chairman.

The government's share was 58 percent at the end of 1958 and 54 percent in 1966, when insurance companies, banks, other companies and about 1,500 individuals held the remainder. With total assets of Rs 567.5 million in 1969, it was the biggest company on the Karachi Stock Exchange.

The World Bank lent KESC US$13.8 million in 1955, $14 million in 1958 and $2.4 million in 1959. The loans helped pay for a 30 MW steam station at West Wharf, a 60 MW extension to it and a 16 MW diesel station at the Sind Industrial Trading Estate (SITE). The West Wharf station, ordered from Siemens in 1952, began operating late in 1956, and the SITE station was built between 1961 and 1964. By 1967, the West Wharf station had eight units with a combined capacity of 115 MW. A new steam station at Korangi opened in 1965 with two 66 MW units financed by USAID, and two 125 MW units followed in 1970 and 1977.

The Economic Reforms Order of January 1972 covered the industries listed in its First Schedule, including electricity generation, transmission and distribution. A cell set up in the Ministry of Finance that month was to take KESC over from the Ministry of Natural Resources, but the company was removed from the cell's purview on April 6, 1972. Along with other electricity supply companies, KESC was nationalised in 1973 and became the responsibility of the federal Ministry of Water and Power. By 1979, banks and insurance companies under government control owned 30 percent of KESC's shares, on top of the 40 percent that the government held directly.

Gas-turbine stations went into service at Korangi Town in 1978 and at SITE in 1980. The Bin Qasim Thermal Power Station received six 210 MW steam units between 1983 and 1997, for a total of 1,260 MW. The sixth unit was partly financed by loans from the Japanese government.

In 1999, the Sharif administration handed over the KESC to Corps of Electrical and Mechanical Engineering of Pakistan Army to address the electricity theft issues.. The government, which owned 63 percent of the shares by 2001, turned roughly Rs 80 billion that KESC owed it into shares before privatising the company. At an auction on February 4, 2005, Kanooz Al-Watan offered Rs 1.65 a share, or Rs 15.86 billion, for 73 percent of the company, but it withdrew and forfeited its deposit. The runner-up, a consortium led by Hassan Associates, matched the price, and the sale of 73 percent of KESC to investors led by Saudi Arabia's Al-Jomaih group and Kuwait's National Industries Group was completed on November 29, 2005. Subsequently, other consortium members divested their investment in KE through open market and KES Power became the single largest shareholder of KE. They held most of it through KES Power, a holding company registered in the Cayman Islands.

=== Private ownership (2005–present) ===
In 2007, the company proposed renaming itself Karachi Electric Supply Company Limited, arguing that in a privately owned company the word Corporation misleadingly hinted at ties to the federal government. Under an agreement announced in October 2008, Abraaj Capital, a firm based in the United Arab Emirates, subscribed for new shares in KES Power, which gave it half the holding company and management control of KESC. In April 2009, the government approved its US$361 million investment for a controlling stake. In 2011, the company offered severance to about 4,500 of its 18,000 employees, and in the 2012 financial year it made its first profit in 17 years. In January 2014, at an event marking its centenary, it changed its name to K-Electric.

In June 2014, the National Electric Power Regulatory Authority (NEPRA) found that the company's managers had over-billed consumers on orders issued by its former chief executive in September 2012. In 2019, NEPRA found K-Electric at fault in 19 of the 35 deaths from electrocution during the July and August rains, blaming poorly earthed poles and current leakage, and fined it Rs 50 million.

In October 2016, Abraaj agreed to sell KES Power's 66.4 percent stake in K-Electric for US$1.77 billion to Shanghai Electric Power, a company backed by the Chinese state. Abraaj's liquidation in 2018 followed a financial scandal involving its founder, Arif Naqvi. In 2022, Shaheryar Chishty's AsiaPak Investments acquired Abraaj's 53.8 percent interest in KES Power through Sage Venture Group, a company registered in the British Virgin Islands. A dispute with KES Power's minority shareholders, Al-Jomaih Power and Denham Investments, then kept the new owners from control of the board for more than three years. Shanghai Electric Power's board ended the purchase on September 9, 2025, saying that the closing conditions had not been met. In January 2026, the two minority shareholders withdrew their claims against K-Electric in a Sindh High Court suit. Moonis Alvi, chief executive since 2018, resigned in February 2026, and in April 2026 Chishty became chairman and Syed Taha, a former chief executive of Pakistan State Oil, took over as chief executive.

== Operations ==
K-Electric generates electricity and runs the transmission and distribution network in a service area of about 6,500 square kilometres. Besides Karachi, the area includes Dhabeji and Gharo in Sindh and Hub, Uthal, Vinder and Bela in Balochistan. It operates a network of 74 grid stations, 1,400 km of transmission lines, and 30,000 km of distribution lines.

The two oldest 210 MW units of Bin Qasim Power Station-I reached the end of their licensed life in October 2023, and but they will remain in service until 2027. The 560 MW Bin Qasim Power Station-II, a combined cycle power plant with three gas turbines and a steam turbine, began operating in 2012. The 900 MW Bin Qasim Power Station-III has two 450 MW units with Siemens SGT5-4000F gas turbines. Siemens and Harbin Electric won the contract to build it in 2019, and the first firing of its first unit took place in March 2022. The company also runs the 247.5 MW Korangi Combined Cycle Power Plant, whose four General Electric LM6000 gas turbines were commissioned in 2008 and 2009, and two gas-engine plants of about 107 MW each at Korangi and SITE, which entered service in 2009. The SITE and Korangi Town gas-turbine stations, with a combined capacity of about 96 MW, had been short of gas and increasingly costly to maintain since 2018. In 2025, it was decommissioned.

== See also ==
- List of electric supply companies in Pakistan
- Electricity Sector in Pakistan
