= National Electric Power Regulatory Authority =

Regulatory Body in Pakistan

National Energy and Power Regulatory Administration
- نیپرا
- NEPRA Logo

Agency overview
- Formed: December 16, 1997; 28 years ago
- Type: Electricity Supply in Pakistan
- Jurisdiction: Government of Pakistan
- Headquarters: Islamabad Capital Territory Pakistan
- Employees: 12453 (as of 1 April 2016)
- Agency executive: Waseem Mukhtar, Chairman of NEPRA
- Website: www.nepra.org.pk

The National Electric Power Regulatory Authority (Urdu: نیپرا, abbreviated as NEPRA) is responsible for regulating the electricity supply in Pakistan. It is also responsible for issuing licenses for electricity generation, transmission, and distribution; establishing and enforcing standards to ensure operational quality and safety; approving utility companies’ investment and power acquisition programs; and determining tariffs for electric power. NEPRA was created when the Parliament of Pakistan passed the Regulation of Generation, Transmission and Distribution of Electric Power Act, 1997.

== Composition ==
NEPRA consists of a chairman appointed by the Federal Government and four members from each of the four provinces of Pakistan.

- Waseem Mukhtar Chairman NEPRA
- Mathar Niaz Rana representing the province of Baluchistan
- Engr. Maqsood Anwar Khan the Member representing the province of Khyber Pakhtunkhuwa
- Rafique Ahmad Shaikh representing the province of Sindh
- Ms. Amina Ahmed representing the province of Punjab

There is also a vice-chairman of the Authority, appointed from among the Members for a period of one year, by rotation.

== See also ==
- List of electric supply companies in Pakistan
- Electricity in Pakistan
- Water and Power Development Authority
- Economy of Pakistan
- Pakistan Electric Power Company
- Water and Power Development Authority
- Alternative Energy Development Board
- K-Electric
