= Water and Power Development Authority =

Government agency of Pakistan

Water & Power Development Authority
- مقتدرہِ آب و برق ترقی
- Emblem of WAPDA

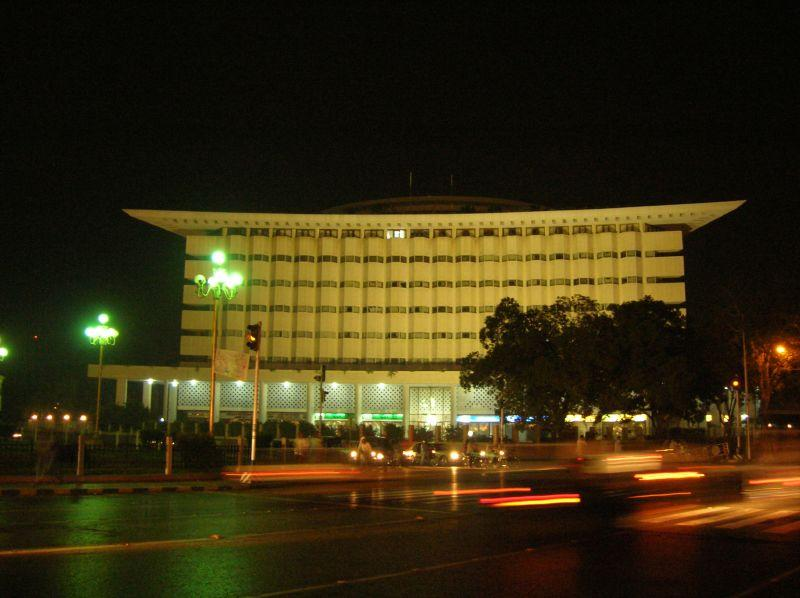
- WAPDA House, Lahore-54000, Pakistan

Agency overview
- Formed: February 22, 1958; 68 years ago
- Type: Power and hydrology
- Jurisdiction: Federal Government of Pakistan
- Headquarters: WAPDA House, Lahore-54000, Pakistan
- Agency executive: Lt Gen Muhammad Saeed, Chairman of Wapda with BPS 22
- Parent agency: Ministry of Water Resources
- Website: www.wapda.gov.pk

The Pakistan Water & Power Development Authority (Urdu: مقتدرہِ آب و برق ترقی), colloquially known as WAPDA, is a Pakistani government-owned public utility agency maintaining hydropower and water in Pakistan, although it does not manage thermal power plants. WAPDA includes the Tarbela and Mangla dams among its most notable resources. It is headquartered in Lahore. The current chairman of WAPDA is Lt. General (R) Muhammad Saeed, who has held the position since August 2025.

== History ==
WAPDA was established by an act of parliament in 1958 to unify the maintenance of infrastructure previously overseen by provincial agencies. Its chairmen included notable civil servants such as Ghulam Ishaq Khan, Ghulam Faruque Khan, and Aftab Ghulam Nabi Kazi. In October 2007, the management of thermal power was transferred to the newly formed Pakistan Electric Power Company (PEPCO).

== WAPDA Water vision 2025 ==
WAPDA formulated a comprehensive $25–33 billion National Water Resource and Hydropower Development Programme, entitled Water Vision 2025. The Water Vision 2025 projects are expected to generate 16,000 MW of hydroelectricity. Other goals are to prevent water shortages, limit drought and increase water storage for a growing population. Five massive hydropower projects have been announced by the President of Pakistan; these are to be completed by 2016, with a generation capacity of 9,500 MW. Two of the projects are ready for construction, while three are in the stages of feasibility studies and preparation of tender documents.

== Hospitals ==
There is a 260-bed WAPDA teaching hospital complex at Lahore providing medical services to those in need. Additionally, there are 50-bed hospitals at Tarbela, Peshawar, Gujranwala, Faisalabad, Hyderabad, Multan, Quetta and Guddu, and 20-bed hospital at Mangla and Sukkur, which are fully functional and proving in-house services in all major clinical disciplines.

== Key WAPDA chairmen ==
Period	Chairman	Highlights
1958	Ghulam Faruque Khan	Chairman of East Pakistan WAPDA
1961	Ghulam Ishaq Khan	Oversaw Mangla & Warsak Dam projects
1960s (exact date unspecified)	Aftab Ghulam Nabi Kazi	Honoured for Mangla Dam inauguration
~2003	Zafar Mehmood	Resigned citing personal reasons
2016 – 2022	Lt.General (R) Muzammil Hussain	Spearheaded "Decade of Dams" & green Eurobond
Aug 2022 – Jun 2025	Lt.General (R) Sajjad Ghani (23rd chairman)	Continued infrastructure expansion
June 2025- August 2025	Naveed Asghar Chaudhry (acting)	
4 August 2025	Lt.General (R) Muhammad Saeed	

== See also ==
- Electricity distribution companies of Pakistan
- Dams and reservoirs in Pakistan
- Electricity sector in Pakistan
- Economy of Pakistan
- Alternative Energy Development Board
- National Electric Power Regulatory Authority
- K-Electric
