= Wind power in Pakistan =

Wind power is a form of renewable energy in Pakistan which makes up more than 6% of the total electricity production in the country. As of early 2026, wind power capacity in Pakistan was 2.29 gigawatts (GW).

== History ==
The first practical wind-powered machines, the windmill and the windpump, were invented in what are now Afghanistan, Iran and Pakistan by the 9th century.

== Wind corridors ==
The Pakistan Meteorological Department conducted a study in 2013 entitled "Wind Power Potential Survey of Coastal Areas of Pakistan", which the Ministry of Science & Technology provided funding for. This study enabled PMD to identify potential "wind corridors" where economically feasible wind farm could be established. The Gharo-Jhimpir wind corridor in Sindh was identified as the most lucrative site for wind power plants. The wind power potential covered an area of 9700 km^{2} with a gross wind power potential of 43000 MW.

== Plants ==
=== Jhimpir Wind Power Plant ===
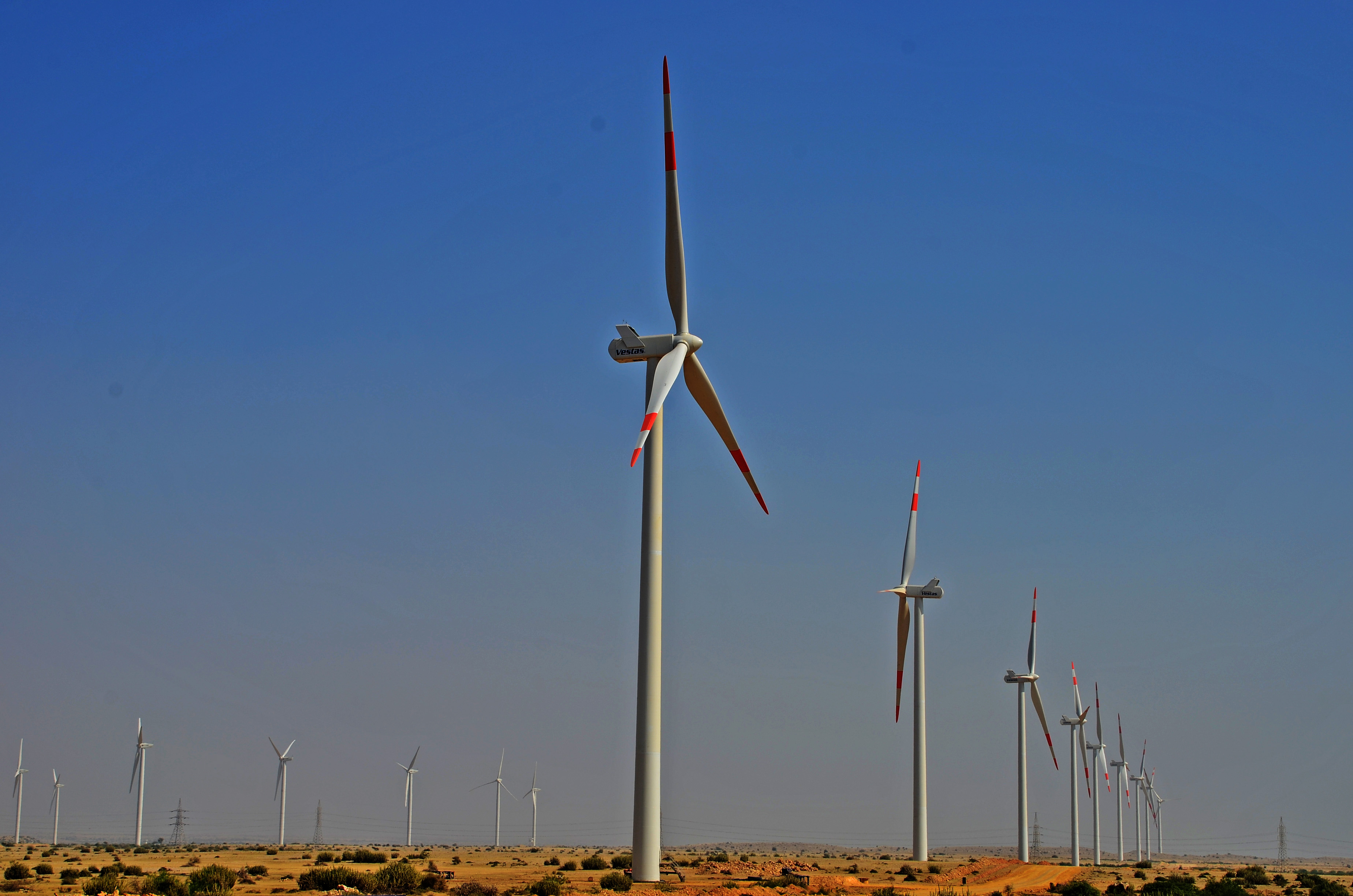
Jhimpir Wind Farm

The Jhimpir Wind Power Plant was developed in Jhimpir, Sindh by Zorlu Energy Pakistan. The total cost of the project is $136 million. Completed in 2002, it has a total capacity of 50 MW. This wind corridor has a 50000 megawatt potential with average wind speeds ofover 7 meters per second. The government has announced an up-front tariff and ROI of 17 per cent, which is the highest in the world.

=== Foundation Wind Energy I and II ===
Fauji Foundation set up two wind projects (50 MW each) at Gharo, Thatta District. The EPC contractors were Nordex and Descon, with Nordex as the lead contractor. Foundation Wind Energy II (Private) Limited was commissioned in July 2014. Foundation Wind Energy I (Private) Limited was commissioned in February 2015.

=== Artistic Energy (Pvt) Ltd. ===
Artistic Energy (Pvt) Ltd. set up a 49.3 MW wind power project in Jhimpir Sindh. The EPC contractor was HydroChina. Artistic Energy (Pvt) Ltd was commissioned in March 2018. It consists of 29 wind turbines GE 1.7 MW each, and having hub height of 92m, the highest hub height in the region. It supplies power to 220 kV Jhimpir New Grid Station through two 132KV lines: Tapal line and New Jhimpir line.

=== Three Gorges First Wind Farm ===
Three Gorges First Wind Farm Pakistan started the operation of 50 MW wind power project on 24 November 2014 at Jhimpir, Sindh. Contract of supply and installation of wind turbines was given to GOLDWIND, and EPC contractor in the project was CWE (China International Water & Electric Corporation). TGF is the sister concern of China Three Gorges Corporation (CTG), who built the world's largest dam with the installed capacity of 22500 MW in Yiling District, Yichang, Hubei, China. Three Gorges also planned to build two more wind power projects of 50 MW each in Jhimphir, Sindh in 2015.

Pakistan started the operation of a 50 MW wind power project in 2018 at Jhimpir, Sindh. Contract of supply and installation of wind turbines was given to GOLDWIND.

=== Sapphire Wind Power Plant ===
A 52.8 MW wind power plant attained commercial operation date (COD) in a record time of only 14 months on 22 November 2015. Its availability in RRT (run reliability test) was also a record in Pakistan. HydroChina, a Chinese EPC contractor using 33x1.68 MW GE wind turbines constructed the power plant. SWPCL is the first wind project of General Electric in Pakistan and it was also a first project of HydroChina. Some $95 million debt financing was secured for the project from Oversees Private Investment Corporation (OPIC), USA. The project is a joint ownership of Sapphire Textile and Bank Alfalah.

=== Tricon Boston Consulting corporation Wind Power Plant ===
Tricon Boston Consulting corporation set up a 50 MW * 3 = 150MW wind power project in Jhimpir Sindh. The EPC contractor was HydroChina International. Tricon Boston was commissioned in 2018. It consists of 87 wind turbines GE 1.7 MW. It supplies power to 220 kV Jhimpir New Grid Station through two 132KV lines.

=== ACT Wind Farm ===
The ACT Wind Farm is located at the province of Sindh. HydroChina, a subsidiary of China Power Construction Corporation, is constructing the project. It will be run by three local Pakistani groups: Akhtar, Candyland and Tapal Groups. The deal is for 20 GW82 1.5MW turbines. The machines will be customised to suit the local wind and climate conditions. Shipments were scheduled to be made at the end of 2015. Installation work was scheduled for completion in the third quarter of 2016. The plant went live on 7 October 2016.

=== Metro Power Company Limited ===
Metro Power Project, a 50 MW wind power project of Metro Power Company Limited located in Jhimpir, district Thatta, Sindh, achieved financial close on 19 February 2015. The project was expected to reach commercial operation by August 2016. The initiative, sponsored by Iqbal Ali Mohamed and family, Infraco Asia Development Pvt Ltd out of Singapore and International Finance Corporation, was scheduled to commence operation in third quarter 2016. It was financed by ETDB, National Bank, UBL, Bank Alfalah and Askari Bank.

== List ==
=== Operational ===
Station	Location	Capacity (MW)	Wind turbine manufacturer	In-service date	Operation & maintenance	Notes
FFC Energy Wind Project	Jhimpir, Sindh	49.5	Nordex	2013	Descon Power Solutions	
Zorlu Enerji Pakistan	Jhimpir, Sindh	56.4	Vestas	2013	In-house	
Three Gorges	Jhimpir, Sindh	150	Goldwind	2014	In-house	First Three Gorges Wind Project of 50MW was commissioned in 2014. Second and third were commissioned in 2018.
Foundation Wind Energy	Gharo, Sindh	100	Nordex	2015	Descon Power Solutions	
Sapphire Wind Power	Jhimpir, Sindh	52.8	General Electric	2015	Albario Engineering	
Yunus Energy	Jhimpir, Sindh	50	Nordex	2016	Descon Power Solutions	
Metro Wind Power	Jhimpir, Sindh	50	Nordex	2016	Descon Power Solutions	
Tenaga Generai	Gharo, Sindh	49.5	General Electric	2016	Albario Engineering	
Gul Ahmed Wind Power	Jhimpir, Sindh	50	Nordex	2016	Descon Power Solutions	
Master Wind Energy	Jhimpir, Sindh	52.8	General Electric	2016	Albario Engineering	
ACT Wind	Jhimpir, Sindh	30	Goldwind	2016	HydroChina	Formerly known as the Tapal Wind Energy (Private) Limited which was formed on 6 December 2010. It is a joint venture between Tapal Group, Akhtar Group, and Ismail Industries. ACT Wind has outsourced operation & maintenance to HydroChina for ten years.
HydroChina Dawood Wind Power Project	Gharo, Sindh	50	Ming Yang	2017	HydroChina	
Sachal Energy Wind Farm	Jhimpir, Sindh	50	Goldwind	2017	In-house	
United Energy Pakistan Wind	Jhimpir, Sindh	100	Goldwind	2017	China Gezhouba Group	
Hawa Energy Ltd	Jhimpir, Sindh	50	General Electric	2018	Albario Engineering	
Burj Capital Jhimpir Wind Power	Jhimpir, Sindh	50	General Electric	2018	Albario Engineering	
Artistic Energy	Jhimpir, Sindh	49.3	General Electric	2018	Descon Power Solutions	Formerly known as Hartford Alternative Energy Pvt Limited
Tricon Boston	Jhimpir, Sindh	150	General Electric	2018	Albario Engineering	Tricon Boston Consulting Corporation is a subsidiary of Sapphire Textile.
Zephyr Power	Gharo, Sindh	50	Siemens Gamesa	2019	Orient Energy Systems	The turbines were provided by Siemens Gamesa, which was their first contract in Pakistan. It is funded by CDC Group UK.

=== Under-development ===
Station	Location	Capacity (MW)	In-service date	Wind turbine	Notes
Tricom Wind Power Ltd	Jhimpir, Sindh	50	2021	Siemens Gamesa	Under construction. To be operational by Dec 2021. The project is sponsored by Yunus Brothers Group. The wind turbines are provided by Siemens Gamesa.
Metro Wind Power Ltd	Jhimpir, Sindh	60	2021	Siemens Gamesa	Under construction. The EPC contractor of the project is HydroChina and wind turbines are provided by Siemens Gamesa.
Din Energy Ltd	Jhimpir, Sindh	50	2021	Goldwind	Under construction. The project is sponsored by the Din Group which is active in textile and leather industry in Pakistan. The EPC contractor of the project is HydroChina and wind turbines are provided by Goldwind.
Act 2 Wind Ltd	Jhimpir, Sindh	50	2021	Goldwind	Under construction. To be operational by Dec 2021. The wind turbines are provided by Goldwind.
Artistic Alternate Energy Pvt Ltd	Jhimpir, Sindh	50	2021	Goldwind	Under construction. The EPC contractor of the project is HydroChina and wind turbines are provided by Goldwind.
Gul Ahmed Electric Pvt Ltd	Jhimpir, Sindh	50	2021	Goldwind	Under construction. The EPC contractor of the project is HydroChina and wind turbines are provided by Goldwind.
Indus Wind Energy Pvt Ltd	Jhimpir, Sindh	50	2021	Siemens Gamesa	Under construction. To be operational by Dec 2021. The wind turbines are provided by Siemens Gamesa.
Liberty Wind Power Pvt Ltd	Jhimpir, Sindh	100	2021	Siemens Gamesa	Under construction. It includes Liberty Wind Power-1 and Liberty Wind Power-2. Formerly known as Zulaikha Energy Pvt Ltd. The wind turbines are provided by Siemens Gamesa.
NASDA Green Energy Pvt Ltd	Jhimpir, Sindh	50	2021	Siemens Gamesa	Under construction. To be operational by Dec 2021. The wind turbines are provided by Siemens Gamesa.
Lakeside Energy Pvt Ltd	Jhimpir, Sindh	50	2021	Siemens Gamesa	Under construction. To be operational by Dec 2021. The wind turbines are provided by Siemens Gamesa.
Master Green Energy Pvt Ltd	Jhimpir, Sindh	50	2021	Siemens Gamesa	Under construction. To be operational by Dec 2021. The wind turbines are provided by Siemens Gamesa.

== See also ==
- Renewable energy in Pakistan
- Solar power in Pakistan
