= Solar power in Pakistan =

- Installed capacity: 5.3 GW (2025, only net metering) (18th)
- Annual generation: 19 TWh (2024)
- Capacity per capita: 22 W (2025, only net metering)
- Share of electricity: 25% (2025)

As of 2025, solar power was the largest electricity source in Pakistan, accounting for more than 25% of total production in 2025. In 2024, solar power installations in the country grew at a high rate with solar installations providing an estimated one-third of the country's entire generating capacity added during the year. As electricity prices doubled from 2021 to 2024, and Chinese solar panel manufacturers with manufacturing overcapacity cut prices, Pakistanis have taken to installing solar panels around the country, importing $1.4 billion of panels from China in the first half of 2024. Imports of solar panels totaled 17GW of capacity in 2024, double the capacity of imports the previous year. In 2024, Pakistan imported more solar panels than any other country in the world.

As of 31 March 2025, Pakistan has reached over ~2,813 MW of net-metered rooftop solar installed, up from about 2,500 MW a year earlier. By the end of April 2025, net-metered solar had reached 5.3 GW (5,300 MW). The country’s total installed generation capacity stood at 46,605 MW by end-March 2025. This includes all sources (hydro, thermal, nuclear, renewable).

Solar power became part of the energy mix in 2013, following government policies aimed at supporting renewable energy development. The country now has seven large-scale solar projects that contribute 530 MW to the national grid, along with a growing number of harder to measure off-grid projects. The country has solar plants in Pakistani Kashmir, Punjab, Sindh and Balochistan. Initiatives are under development by the International Renewable Energy Agency, the Japan International Cooperation Agency, Chinese companies, and Pakistani private sector energy companies. The Quaid-e-Azam Solar Power Park (QASP) was built in the Cholistan Desert, Punjab, in 2015 and has a 400 MW capacity.

== Solar resource ==
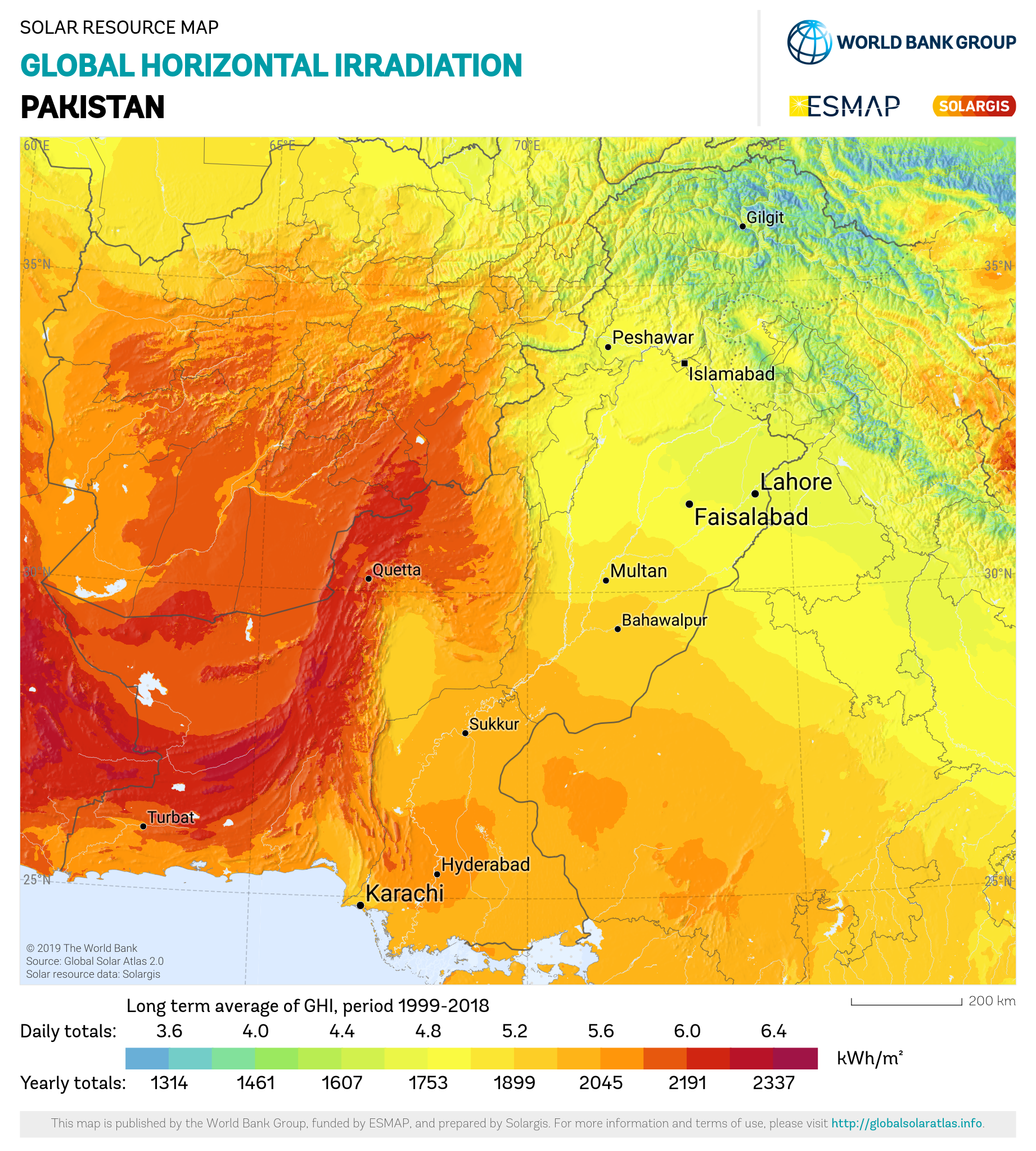
Solar irradiation map of Pakistan

Solar irradiance in Pakistan is 5.3 kWh/m^{2}/day.

== History ==
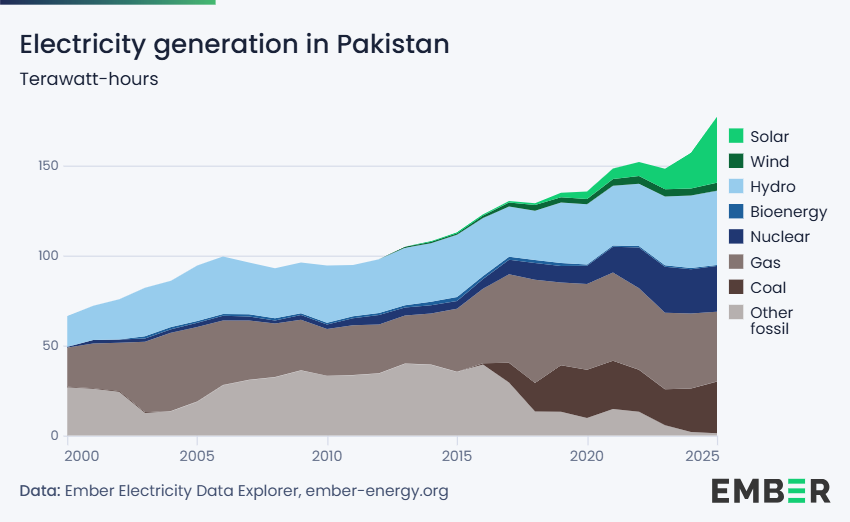
Electricity generation in Pakistan in terawatt-hours

Beginning in the 1980s, the first photovoltaic solar panels were installed in Pakistan in 18 different stations around the country, with a capacity of 440 kW. In 1983, a 6 kW PV system was donated by Kyocera to power the village of Kankoi, but the project was not successful. Due to a lack of expertise and maintenance, further expansion of solar projects was not pursued. In the 1990s, the first renewable energy departments were established in Pakistan, and in the early 21st century, the Alternate Energy Development Board (AEDB) and the Pakistan Council of Renewable Energy Technologies (PCRET) were established. Later in 2013, the AEDB issued a tax exemption for imported solar modules. Pakistan has mostly relied on expensive imports of fossil fuels for electricity production, but as power demand increased throughout the country, this method of production became costly. Increased incentive to install PV systems has given Pakistan a way to reduce reliance on these imports and expand access to electricity to more isolated regions of the country, such as the provinces of Balochistan and Sindh, where the accessibility to the national power grid is 54.7% and 77.6%, respectively.

Solar has expanded rapidly in the country since then, with 2024 seeing an increase in solar panel imports by 227% from 2023. British newspaper The Guardian described the growth as a "people-led solar boom".

== Government policy ==
Raja Pervaiz Ashraf, the Federal Minister of Water & Power of Pakistan, announced on 2 July 2009 that 7,000 villages would be electrified using solar energy by 2014. Senior adviser Sardar Zulfiqar Khosa stated that the Punjab government would begin new projects aimed at power production through coal, solar energy and wind power; this would generate additional resources.

The Government of Pakistan allowed the provincial government of Sindh to conduct feasibility research. The government planned to install a desalination plant powered by solar energy.

On 21 May 2022, Prime Minister Shehbaz Sharif announced the removal of 17 per cent general sales tax on solar panels.

The World Bank reports that Pakistan possesses a solar power potential of 40 GW and has set a goal to achieve 20% of its electricity from renewable sources by 2025. To promote the use of solar energy, Pakistan has introduced incentives, including net metering and feed-in tariffs. Net metering allows small systems to have a payback period of just 2-4 years.

The government recently slashed the buyback rate from about Rs 27/unit to Rs 10/unit for new net-metering users. That’s more than a 60% cut.

The Sindh and Punjab provincial governments announced policies in 2024 to provide free or subsidized solar panels to low income residents to reduce their electricity costs.

== Projects ==
Solar panels at SITE area of Karachi

- Photovoltaic (PV) solar panels: The primary type of solar energy technology being adopted in Pakistan due to low price and ease of installation. In 2025, Pakistan had 689 certified PV installers who completed approximately 143,222 solar PV system installations from July to February of that year.
- Beaconhouse installed the first integrated solar energy system with a 10 kW power generation capacity capable of grid tie-in at Beaconhouse Canal Side Campus, Lahore. It was a pilot project for BSS designed by U.S. consultants, based upon feasibility by the U.S. Trade and Development Agency (USTDA).
- 50 to 100 MW of photovoltaics is expected to be installed in 2013, and at least 300 MW in 2014.
- Quaid-e-Azam Solar Park is Pakistan's first utility-scale solar farm linked to the national power grid. It is located in the Cholistan desert near Bahawalpur City in the Punjab province. The project is part of the China-Pakistan Economic Corridor (CPEC) and is funded by the Chinese firm Zonergy Company Limited. The project began construction in 2015 and had already installed 100 MW of capacity by May of that year. The park is expected to cost PKR-140 billion or 1.38 billion USD, and once completed, will produce 900 MW of electricity.
- The Oracle Power Green Hydrogen Solar Park is planned to produce 700 MW of solar and 500 MW of wind power in Thatta, Sindh Province in Pakistan. The complex will also house a 260 MW battery storage system and a hydrogen production facility that will provide 150,000 kilograms of hydrogen per day or 55 tonnes per year. The project was developed by Oracle Energy and China Electric Power Equipment and Technology (CET), and was approved by the Sindh Environmental Protection Agency (SEPA) in May of 2024.
- In March of 2025, the progress of net metering in Pakistan reached 4.03 GW in commissioned systems. Net metering systems have enabled Pakistani citizens to connect their solar power systems to the national utility grid, allowing them to sell surplus power back to the grid. This helps offset the cost of electricity as well as the startup cost of solar panels. To avail the Net Metering Facility in Pakistan you need to install minimum of 10 KW solar system with on-grid inverter and 20 solar panels.
- Muzaffargarh solar power project
- The Layyah Solar PV Park is owned and being developed by Pakistan’s Alternative Energy Department Board (AEDB) and is located in the Punjab province. The park is expected to be completed and enter operation in 2026, and produce 1200 MW of electricity.
- The Sindh Solar Energy Project (SSEP), funded by the World Bank with $100 million, aims to enhance solar power generation in Sindh Province. It encompasses utility-scale solar development, distributed solar installations on public buildings, and the deployment of solar home systems in areas with limited grid access.
- In February 2025, Punjab Chief Minister Maryam Nawaz Sharif inaugurated a subsidized solarization project for agricultural tube wells in the province. About 87% of these wells are currently powered by diesel or grid power.

== Farming ==
Solar power has allowed Pakistani farmers in isolated regions with limited access to the power grid an alternative way to power tube wells, or pumps that provide groundwater to crops. Diesel-powered generators were traditionally used, but increased prices of diesel fuel due to tariffs on imported fossil fuels and the removal of government subsidies have further incentivized the adoption of solar power. Solar tube wells however are resulting in overuse of ground water resources which if not controlled could result in catastrophic consequences, as reported by Reuters.

== Challenges ==
As solar panels and net metering have become more widely adopted in Pakistan, grid demand and consumption have decreased. Electricity sales dropped by 3% in 2024, even though there was a 6% increase in available consumers. There was an even steeper drop off in the farming and industrial sectors, where sales dropped by 11% in the same year. This has caused fossil fuel plants and thermal power plants to become underutilized. Pakistan financed many of these plants under the China–Pakistan Economic Corridor partnership, and this debt still has to be repaid. As more consumers reduce consumption or stop using the power grid altogether, power plants are forced to increase their prices to maintain similar revenue to pay off this debt, further incentivizing more consumers to adopt solar power.

== Public reception ==
Pakistan's solar energy boom, which accelerated in 2023 due to falling global solar panel prices and increased imports from China, led to widespread adoption of solar systems among wealthier individuals and farmers, often supported by government subsidies. Many of these users disconnected from the national electricity grid. With fewer consumers, a subsequent increase in energy prices from fossil-fuel-based power plants followed to sustain profits and maintain aging infrastructure. This increased the cost of electricity for remaining grid-connected consumers who were predominantly low-income households. The Federal Minister of Energy, Awais Leghari, acknowledged policy missteps, noting that officials had encouraged solar producers to offset their bills by selling surplus energy to the national grid. This led the government to pay for power it did not need, allowing affluent landowners and businessmen to access electricity at little or no cost, while poorer citizens faced higher prices.

In June 2025, the Pakistani government imposed a 10% tax on imported solar panels, nearly all of which came from China. Khalid Waleed, an energy economist at the Sustainable Development Policy Institute, warned that the tax could deter lower- and middle-income households from adopting solar technology. He noted that those who might be priced out of switching to solar were the same individuals already bearing the brunt of rising electricity costs. This development risked further deepening the energy divide, as wealthier households remained insulated through solar adoption while poorer consumers faced increasing financial strain.

== See also ==
- Renewable energy in developing countries
- Renewable energy in Pakistan
- Wind power in Pakistan
- International Solar Alliance
