= Zorlu (disambiguation) =

Zorlu is a Turkish surname. It may also refer to:

- Zorlu, Borçka, village in Artvin, Turkey
- Zorlu Center, multiple-use complex in Istanbul, Turkey
- Zorlu Energy Wind Power Project, wind farm in Pakistan
- Zorlu Holding, Turkish company
- Zorlu PSM, performing arts theatre and concert hall in Istanbul, Turkey
