= Zorlu =

Zorlu is a Turkish surname. It is also used as a masculine given name. People with the name include:

== Surname ==
- Ahmet Nazif Zorlu (born 1944), Turkish businessman
- Ergün Zorlu, Turkish tennis player
- Fatin Rüştü Zorlu (1910–1961), Turkish diplomat and politician
- Hacı Mehmet Zorlu (1919–2005), Turkish businessman
- Haydar Zorlu (born 1967), Turkish-German actor
- Sinan Zorlu (born 1995), Turkish badminton player
- Yakup Ramazan Zorlu (born 1991), French-born Turkish football player

== Adjective ==
strong, forceful tough, strong-willed powerful, influential creating trouble and; to persist through adversity

== Given name ==
- Zorlu Tore (born 1956), Turkish Cypriot politician

== See also ==
- Zorlu (disambiguation)
