= Babadag (disambiguation) =

Babadag is a town in Tulcea county, Romania.

Babadag or Babadağ may also refer to:

== Populated places ==
- Babadağ, Denizli, a town in Denizli Province, Turkey
- Babadağ, Muğla, a town in Muğla Province, Turkey

== Mountains ==
- Babadağ (Azerbaijan), a mountain in Ismayilli District
- Babadağ (mountain, Denizli), in Denizli Province, Turkey, also named Karcı Dağı
- Babadağ (mountain, Muğla), in Muğla Province, Turkey, ancient Mount Anticragus

== Other ==
- Babadag Lake, Romania
- Babadag Training Area, military training area, Romania
