= Bekirler =

Bekirler can refer to:

- Bekirler, Babadağ
- Bekirler, Bayramiç
- Bekirler, Nazilli
- Bekirler, Yığılca
