= Sachal Wind Power Project =

Wind farm in Pakistan

- Country: Pakistan
- Location: Jhimpir
- Coordinates: 25°8′13″N 67°56′11″E
- Status: Completed in April 2017
- Construction began: April 2015
- Commission date: 2017
- Site area: 2.75 km^{2} (1.06 mi^{2})

Power generation
- Nameplate capacity: 49.5MW
- Annual net output: 136.5 GW/h

Sachal Wind Power Project is a wind farm with a total capacity of 49.5MW which corresponds to an annual production of approximately 136.5 GW. It is located in Jhimpir, (Pakistan) and located on an area of 2.75 km^{2} (1.06 mi^{2}).
