= Quaid-e-Azam Solar Park =

Photovoltaic power station in Bahawalpur, Pakistan

Quaid-e-Azam Solar Park قائدِ اعظم سولر پارک
- Official name: Quaid-e-Azam Solar Park
- Country: Pakistan
- Location: Bahawalpur, Punjab
- Coordinates: 29°18′53.9″N 71°49′50.2″E
- Status: Operational
- Commission date: Phase 1: 15 July 2015; Phase 2: 31 May 2016; Phase 3: 31 July 2016; Phase 4: 31 July 2016
- Construction cost: Phase 1: US$131.15 Million; Phase 2: US$159.82 million Phase 3: US$135.89 million Phase 4: US$159.82 million
- Owner: Government of Punjab
- Operator: QA Solar

Solar farm
- Type: Flat-panel PV
- Total collector area: 8 km sq.
- Site resource: 1920 kWh/m^{2}/yr
- Site area: 6,500 acres (2,600 ha)

Power generation
- Units operational: Phase 1: 100 MW; Phase 2: 100 MW; Phase 3: 100 MW; Phase 4: 100 MW
- Make and model: JA Solar
- Nameplate capacity: 400 MW (Operational); 1,000 MW (Total planned)

External links
- Website: qasolar.com
- Commons: Related media on Commons

The Quaid-e-Azam Solar Park (Urdu: قائدِ اعظم سولر پارک) is a photovoltaic power station in Bahawalpur, Punjab, Pakistan, named in honor of Quaid-e-Azam Muhammad Ali Jinnah, the Founder of Pakistan. It is a 400 MW solar facility spanning an area of 8 km^{2} and hosting 1.6 million solar modules. The initial phase of the project was constructed by the Government of Punjab through a 100% owned subsidiary QA Solar in May 2015 at a cost of $131 million. On 5 May 2015, the then Prime Minister of Pakistan Nawaz Sharif inaugurated the first 100 MW project and dedicated it to the nation. Subsequent expansion was done in public-private partnership with Appolo Solar Development Pakistan Limited, Best Green Energy Pakistan Limited and Crest Energy Pakistan Limited each installing a 100 MW unit. The next phase of 100 MW will be installed by Zorlu Solar Pakistan (Pvt.) Limited, making it a 500 MW facility. Total planned capacity of the solar park is 1,000 MW.

== Background and operation ==
=== History ===
The project of solar powered park was approved by Government of Punjab, Pakistan in August 2013. In Sept 2013, Govt of Punjab signed an MOU with TBEA SunOasis of China to set up a 1000MW_{p} solar power plant. This led to the establishment of the Quaid-e-Azam Solar Park site near Bahawalpur. In late 2013, the Canadian Solar Company, also signed an MOU with Punjab government, for setting up 500 MW solar powered park as an investor with $175 Million. However, Canadian Solar did not pursue this investment option. Government of Punjab decided to initially establish a 100 MW pilot project (Phase-1) before proceeding with the 1,000 MW complete capacity at QA Solar Park, Bahawalpur. Tender was floated at the end of December 2013. After competitive bidding with six bidders, the contract of Phase-1 construction, 100MWp project, was awarded to the lowest qualified bidder TBEA Xinjiang SunOasis Co. Ltd. of China at an EPC contract price of $131.15 million and a 25-year maintenance contract of around $73 million, a total of $215 million. The Letter of Acceptance was issued on April 4, 2014, but the actual EPC and O&M contract was signed on June 2, 2014.

The 100 MW project was completed within the scheduled nine months as per the contract and was commissioned at the end of March 2015 and was inaugurated on 5 May 2015 by Prime Minister Mian Muhammad Nawaz Sharif in a well-publicized ceremony at Bahawalpur. Not only was the construction and commissioning of the project completed within the contractual period, there were no cost over-runs either. The total cost remained within the contract price of $131.15 with no extensions in cost or time.

=== Technical details of Phase-1 (100 MW project) ===
Quaid-e-Azam Solar Park is located in the desert area of Lal Sohanra, Cholistan, Bahawalpur, and is situated around 10 km from Bahawalpur airport. It is the largest solar plant in Pakistan. It produces 100 MW, spans 500 acres (200 ha), and hosts 392,158 solar modules. The project was commissioned in March 2015 at a total cost of $131.15 million plus a 25-year maintenance contract of $73 million (total contract of EPC plus O&M of $215 million),. An equity of 30% was injected by the owner Government of Punjab, Pakistan and financed 70% by Bank of Punjab. The construction of the project was done by TBEA Xinjiang SunOasis Co. Ltd. The land for the project is provided by the Government of Punjab at a lease of $1 per acre per year.

The initial project plan was to build 1000 MW_{p} across three phases of construction. The first phase of project 100 MW_{p} was installed over an area of 500 acres. The PV area has 392,158 solar modules of 255 W_{p} each, nearly 10,000 solar arrays of 40 modules each, 1,400 combiner boxes, 100 centralized inverters of 1 MW each, 100 transformers of 1 MVA each at 33kV, all of these linked through a network of thousands of kilometers of cables. The arrays are fixed to the ground using 140,000 screw piles. There is no concrete foundation. The EPC contract included provision of a 132kV substation which includes 2 transformers of 100 MVA each at 132 kV. The substation area also includes 100MVA switch gear and VAR protection along with a state of the art DCS and SCADA control system. The 132KV electrical output of the power plant is connected to the NTDC national grid via a 132kV transmission line that runs through the Solar Park. Phase-1 construction was conducted by Xinjiang SunOasis over the course of three months.

=== Phase-II construction plans ===
The second phase of project started in September 2015 by issuance of a letter of Intent (LOI) to Zonergy, a subsidiary of ZTE, a telecommunication giant of China. However, Water and Power Development Authority (WAPDA), immediately criticized the award of the contract without competitive bidding and completion of the entire process in just one week's time. The central contract cell of WAPDA narrated, "Entire deal is shrouded in mystery and would create legal and contractual problems for everyone." Apparently, Zoenergy was not considered for the 100 MW, first phase of the project construction, attributing it as Telecommunication company. Opposition took the government to Supreme Court of Pakistan in November 2014, on violation of Public Procurement Regulatory Authority (PEPRA) rules and fast track award of the contract. Anwar Kamal, a legal expert, said that, "accepting high risk bank guarantees creating rights for the investor will haunt Punjab government in future. The federal bodies were totally ignored and Punjab government conducted the matter in non transparent way." It was noted that during awarding of contract to Zoenergy, several renowned power firms were ignored and the contract was given to a telecommunication firm without any competitive bidding.

Despite all the litigation, a $1.5 billion contract was awarded to Zonergy Company Ltd for 900 MW project to be completed in Phase 2 (up to 300 MW) and Phase 3 (up to 900 MW) with the aim of approaching planned 1000 MW. In June 2015, the Chief Minister of Punjab, Shahbaz Sharif announced that 300 MW production will start from the end of 2015, and entire 1000 MW production will be commenced by 2016. To follow the operation closely, he appointed Ahad Cheema, a 20th grade officer, who was already working as director general of the Lahore Development Authority (LDA), as executive officer of the project. In a follow-up meeting in July 2015, Prime Minister Mian Muhammad Nawaz Sharif directed project stakeholders to expedite the work and complete the 300 MW production phase by end of 2015 and the entire 1000 MW by April 2016. However, Zonergy Company Ltd. was unable to complete any targets amid different problems and the project was not able to exceed the Phase-1 100 MW installation.

Xinjiang SunOasis continued to provide materials to complete Phase-II construction. Phase II was marked as completed in August 2016 with an installed capacity of 400 MW. However, it appears only 100 MW is being produced at this facility as of December 2021.

=== Interest by Turkish companies ===
In January 2017, a Turkish company called Zorlu Enerji also showed interest to develop 100 MW project in 6 months at the 1000 MW QASP site. In February 2018, Zorlu Enerji again showed their interest in similar venture; however, the project was not able to kick off for unknown reasons.

== Hurdles, conflicts and plans of privation ==
=== Operational hurdles ===
Quaid-e-Azam Solar Park was unable to produce affordable energy and expected output, due to several reasons:

1. Bahawalpur is desert terrain, having high dust count, therefore, the efficiency of panels were reduced by 40%. It required 30 people to clean panels with 15 days to restore the panels back to their full capacity, which reduced production of installed 100MW plant to below 18 MW.
2. Each of the 400,000 installed panels required one litre of water to clean. A 15 days cleaning cycle required 124 million litres of water (enough to sustain 9000 people) while rain in the Cholistan desert is rare and far between. Providing such huge amount of water in desert terrain, became a challenging and daunting task for management team. Besides, the manual cleaning methods allowed setting of dust before it was re-cleaned.
3. The temperature of Bahawalpur rises above 45 degrees Celsius, which is much higher than the 25 degrees Celsius required for efficient solar power production.
4. QASP produced too little power at too much cost, in fact it had the second highest per unit cost in Pakistan after the Nandipur Power Project. The upfront capital expenses (CAPEX) of $131.15 million ($1.31 million/MW) was very high like other solar projects; while unlike other solar plants it was unable to achieve balanced recurring operational expenses (OPEX) due to low power production of 18 MW against the expected 100 MW.

Due to the aforementioned reasons, the project faced long-term operational hurdles and conflicts with the National Electric Power Regulatory Authority (NEPRA). Despite the fact that Balochistan is more suitable for solar power with more barren land and suitable dust count, Government of Punjab convinced the Prime Minister that Punjab is more suitable venue for solar power. Chief Minister Shahbaz Sharif later accepted that producing 18.5 MW for Rs. 13.5 billion is an expensive deal.

=== Tariff conflicts with NEPRA ===
A MOU signed in July 2014 determined the tariff of Rs. 14 between Government of Punjab and China. Based on this, NEPRA granted astonishingly high tariff of Rs. 14 to QASP Pvt. Ltd, while the rest of the world enjoyed solar tariff of less than Rs. 4. For example, solar prices in India touched INR 2.42 with decrease in cost in solar production. Though the interest rate in Pakistan is much lower than India, Brazil, South Africa, Mexico etc. and Pakistan offers entire foreign equity and no taxes; but still it has the highest solar tariff in the world. NEPRA in September 2016 tried to reduced the tariff from Rs. 14.5 per unit to Rs 9.25 per unit, maintaining that cost of solar production had reduced sharply in the last 4 years and besides it is much lower in other parts of the world. However, Zonergy threatened to withdraw from Phase-2 and Phase-3 of project, and asked the Chief Minister of Punjab to pressure NEPRA. After signaling to withdraw its commitment of 900 MW extension, she went into litigation over the matter. Finally, the scores were settled attributing subsidy contributed by Ministry of Water and Power; however, it added to existing circular debt and the remaining was transferred to consumers. In February 2017 Ministry of Water and Power accepted that Rs.100 billion is paid each year as subsidy in the power sector while Rs. 200 billion is paid by consumers as various surcharges. Nevertheless, several financial experts criticized the high solar tariff despite decrease in solar production costs. For example, Dr. Farrukh Saleem criticized the current Rs. 18 tariff of QASP and compared it with the Rewa Ultra Mega Solar in Madhya Pradesh (India), where the tariff is equivalent to Pakistani Rs. 5.19 only. The high production costs of the project, ongoing tariff conflicts between both sides and long term maintenance costs impeded extension aims and future investments.

=== Plans of privatisation ===
Initially planned to install 1,000 MW the project was later curtailed. The initial 100 MW plant was commissioned in May 2015, and was completed by TBEA Xinjiang SunOasis Co. Ltd. It was decided in June 2017 to privatise the solar park, due to 18 MW production against 100 MW capacity and its high maintenance costs. A major controversy broke in December 2017, when a company named Jahangir Siddiqui & Co Ltd (JSCL), owned by Ali Jehangir Siddiqui, the business partner and close friend of Sharif family, was pre-qualified to attain 100% equity stake in Quaid-e-Azam Solar Power (Private) Limited. It was also feared that entire tax exception awarded to privatization of the project is done to facilitate Ali Jehangir Siddiqui. Despite the criticism on awarding business partners for ownership of the project, Jahangir Siddiqui & Co. was invited in March 2018 to submit bid along with eight other companies.

Although the bidding process was due to be completed in April 2018, the process was delayed because of a corruption probe by the National Accountability Bureau (NAB) initiated by Chief Justice of Pakistan Mian Saqib Nisar, after heavy misappropriation was found in the Auditor General of Pakistan (AGP)'s report.

== Controversies and criticism ==
=== Inefficient production at high cost ===
Quaid-e-Azam solar park produced too little and too expensive power. In spite of high upfront capital expenses (CAPEX) like other solar projects, it was unable to achieve balanced operating expenses (OPEX). With total of upfront $131.15 million ($1.31 million / MW) CAPEX it produced only 18 MW for installed 100 MW capacity. The low production was attributed to the dusty environment of Cholistan desert and unsuitable weather conditions. Chief minister of Punjab Shahbaz Shareef admitted that 18.5 MW at the cost of Rs. 13.5 billion is an expensive affair. Wind power would have been a better option if the project was meant to be installed in short time. For each installed MW of solar plant produce 17.5% as compared to 35% for wind, therefore, it would take 2 MW for $2.66 million to get the same for 1 MW of wind power for $2.1 million. The uplift tariff of NEPRA is also 32% more expensive i.e. 14% per cent for solar and 10.6% for wind. The Chief Minister also admitted that hydropower is the best option in terms of per unit cost with much higher yield. Hydropower with Rs. 13.5 billion would produce 90 MW instead of 18.5 MW with far less tariff.

Financial analyst Farrukh Saleem wrote that solar energy generated in Pakistan had amongst the highest per unit costs. Although the global cost of production for solar energy declined sharply between 2012 and 2017, contractors are paid large sums. As an example, QASP produced electricity at a cost of Rs. 19.83/kWh, compared to Rs. 5.19/kWh for energy produced at Rewa Ultra Mega Solar in Madhya Pradesh, India. This is despite a low tax rate and a liberal foreign equity repatriation regime in Pakistan in contrast to India. According to Ministry of Water and Power the costs of the expensive tariff and the subsidies given to the project are borne by the consumers in the form of high surcharges.

=== Auditor General of Pakistan (AGP) Inquiry report ===
In March 2018 the Auditor General of Pakistan published a shocking report of serious irregularities in the award of procurements and construction (EPC) contracts and operation and maintenance (O&M) contracts:

- The contractor with the lowest bid, M/S Chint, was not awarded the contract; instead it was given to TBEA without any plausible reason. This caused the national exchequer a loss of $19.345 million.
- Violations of procurements were found in 2017 against Public Procurement Regulatory Authority (PEPRA) rules. It was revealed that subcontracts were awarded to companies with dubious profiles in non transparent ways.
- Mr. Rashid Majeed was a member of the technical and financial bid committee and favored TBEA. Later he managed to obtain EPC and O&M contracts triggering a conflict of interest. He also appointed himself as consultant Emeritus getting Rs. 82.737 million, in spite of him being a member of the Bank of Punjab, the lender of the Quaid-e-Azam solar park.
- Serious misuse of vehicles, bonuses, and allowances in services and site reallocations was found among several heads of the company. Even the appointments of CEO, consultants, and excess payments and perks availed during the non transparent processes.
- Excessive payments in Markups were paid, the letter of credit was opened in favour of the parent company, retention of equity funds in BOP and violation of several other procedures and regulations were observation during the course of investigations.

=== Environmental impact of the project ===
Quaid-e-Azam solar park is located in UNESCO declared biosphere reserve, Lal Suhanra National Park. The project affected critical biodiversity site having wildlife like Chinkara (Indian Gazelle), Caracal Cat and Houbara Bustard, due to increased human activity in arid regions and construction of new network for commercial activities. Due to desert terrain, it needed a liter of water to clean each 400,000 panels, requiring 124 million liters of water annually, enough to feed 9,000 people. The cleaning cycle is repeated after every 15 days; imposing major threats of water reservoirs. Another concern is about fate of millions of PV panels, since they have life of 25 years, hence leaving dump of silicon. The environmentalists and experts reflected their surprise that why Balochistan having lot of barren land, high solar profile and low dust count was not selected as a potential site.

During construction of the project trees worth 100 thousand of rupees were disposed at cheap rates in the dark to open market without any auctioning. Forest department officials said that Vachellia nilotica kikar trees worth 100 thousand of rupees were sold illegally to acquire the site.

=== Probe of misappropriation/corruption ===
Chief Justice of Pakistan, Mian Saqib Nisar took notice of the ongoing corruption inquires for the Quaid-e-Azam solar project, and demanded reports of its monthly production and expenditure information. The case was followed again in May 2018, where the Chief Justice took strict notice on zero power generation in Quaid-e-Azam and Bikki plants. However, the case remained pending after the retirement of Saqib Nisar and no tangible results were produced. In June 2018, the National Accountability Bureau along with other power projects started an inquiry against Quaid-i-Azam Solar power project due to irregularities and alleged corruption in the contracts; it was also recommended to place its CEO Najam Shah on the executive control list (ECL). In June 2018, ex-CEO Ahad Cheema was summoned to court on 56 company cases, to present his views on the Quaid-i-Azam Solar power project. However, he was unable to give satisfactory answers.

== See also ==
- China–Pakistan Economic Corridor
- Energy Department (Punjab, Pakistan)
- List of power stations in Pakistan
- List of photovoltaic power stations
- List of dams and reservoirs in Pakistan
- Solar power in Pakistan
- Renewable energy in Pakistan
- Nandipur Power Project
