= Oğuzlar =

Oğuzlar may refer to the following places in Turkey:

- Oğuzlar, Babadağ
- Oğuzlar, Bismil
- Oğuzlar, Çorum, district and town
- Oğuzlar, Ortaköy, village
- Oğuzlar, Polatlı, village
