= İncirpınar, Babadağ =

Village in Turkey

İncirpınar
- Neighbourhood
- Location in Turkey İncirpınar (Turkey Aegean)
- Coordinates: 37°49′49″N 28°49′21″E
- Country: Turkey
- Province: Denizli
- District: Babadağ
- Population (2022): 139
- Time zone: UTC+3 (TRT)

İncirpınar is a neighbourhood in the municipality and district of Babadağ, Denizli Province in Turkey. Its population is 139 (2022).
