= Renewable energy in Pakistan =

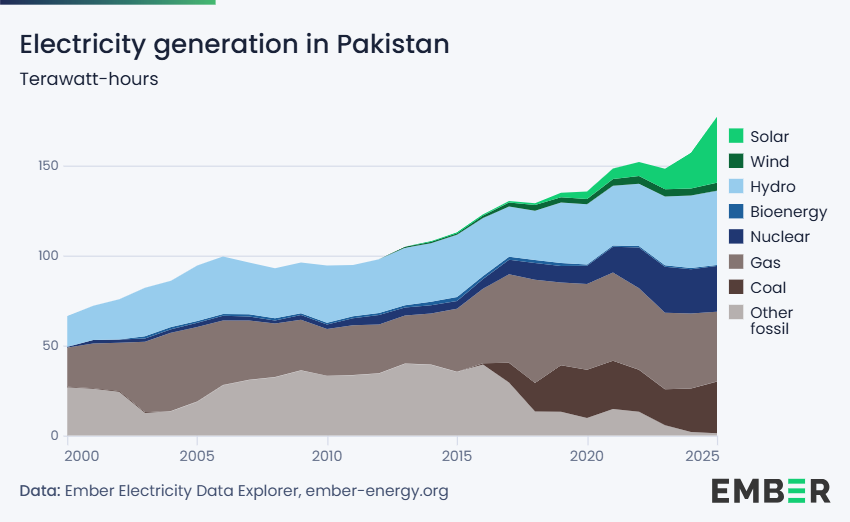
Electricity generation in Pakistan in terawatt-hours

Renewable energy in Pakistan is a relatively underdeveloped sector; however, in recent years, there has been more and more interest to explore renewable energy resources for the energy production. Around 10.57% of Pakistan's total installed power generation capacity (in 2020) is renewable (wind, solar and biogas). Most of Pakistan's renewable energy comes from hydroelectricity. As per the vision of the Prime Minister, there is the aim to "induct 20% of RE by the year 2025 and 30% of RE by the year 2030."

== Solar power ==
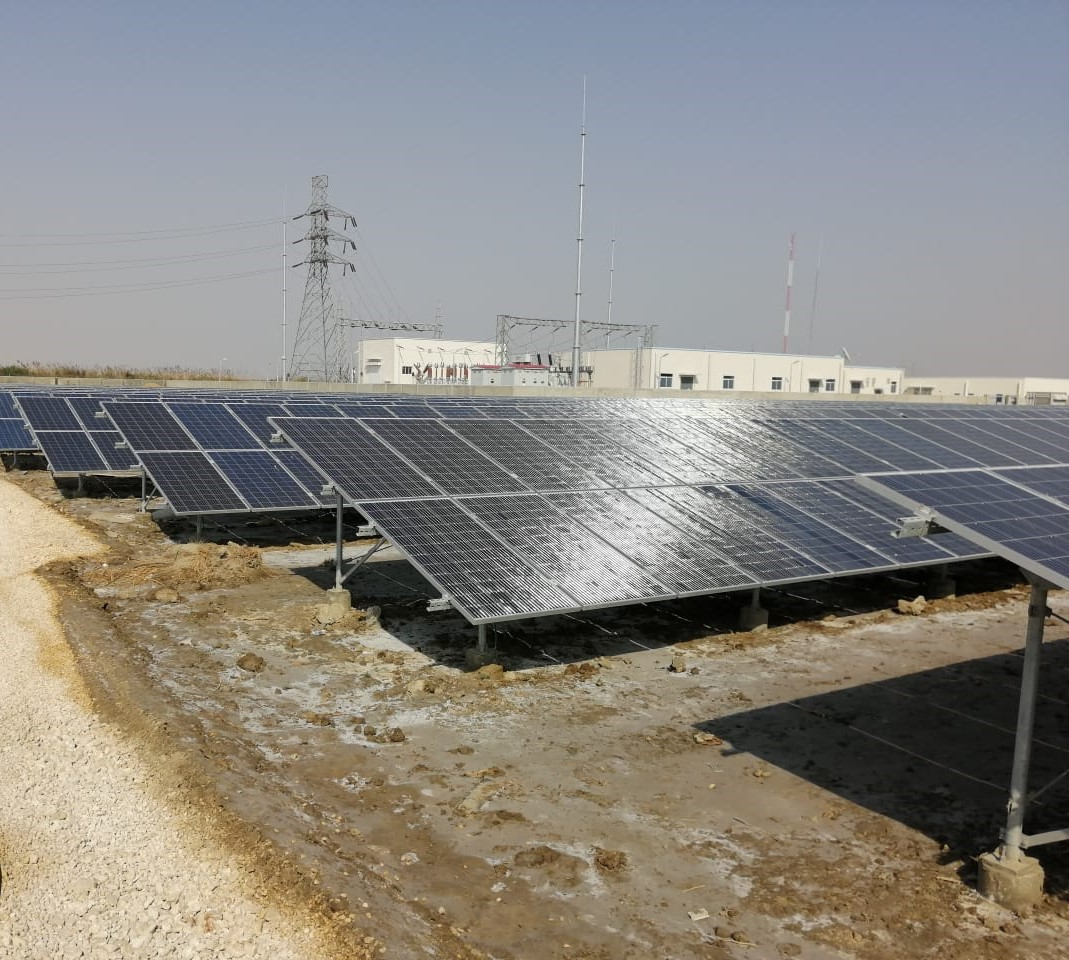
50MW solar park at Gharo

There have been some efforts to install and expand the use of solar energy in Pakistan. Pakistan receives long hours of sunlight throughout the year, with relatively few cloudy days even in the wettest regions. Eight power generation plants have been installed and eleven are in various stages of completion. Further feasibility studies are undergoing. In December 1981, the first solar photovoltaic system was commissioned, located in Mumniala (a village 60 km from Islamabad). Four solar systems has been commissioned in Khukhera (Lasbela district), Ghakar (Attock district), Malmari (Thatta district) (now that system is unserviceable) and Dittal Khan Laghari, Digri (Mirpurkhas district).The Punjab government announced the establishment of Quaid-e-Azam Solar Park over an area of 5,000 acres in the Cholistan Development Authority in Bahawalpur.

A practical example of the use of solar energy can be seen in some rural villages of Pakistan where houses have been provided with solar panels that run electric fans and energy-saving bulbs. One notable and successfully implemented case was the village of Narian Khorian (about 50 kilometers from Islamabad), which employs the use of 100 solar panels installed by a local firm, free of cost; these panels have provide energy through lights and fan facilities to some 100 households. The alternative energy development board installed 200 solar home systems at District Khuzdar Balochistan in a remote off-grid village Karak. Government of Balochistan launched a programme to electrify off-grid villages of various districts through solar technology.

== Wind power ==
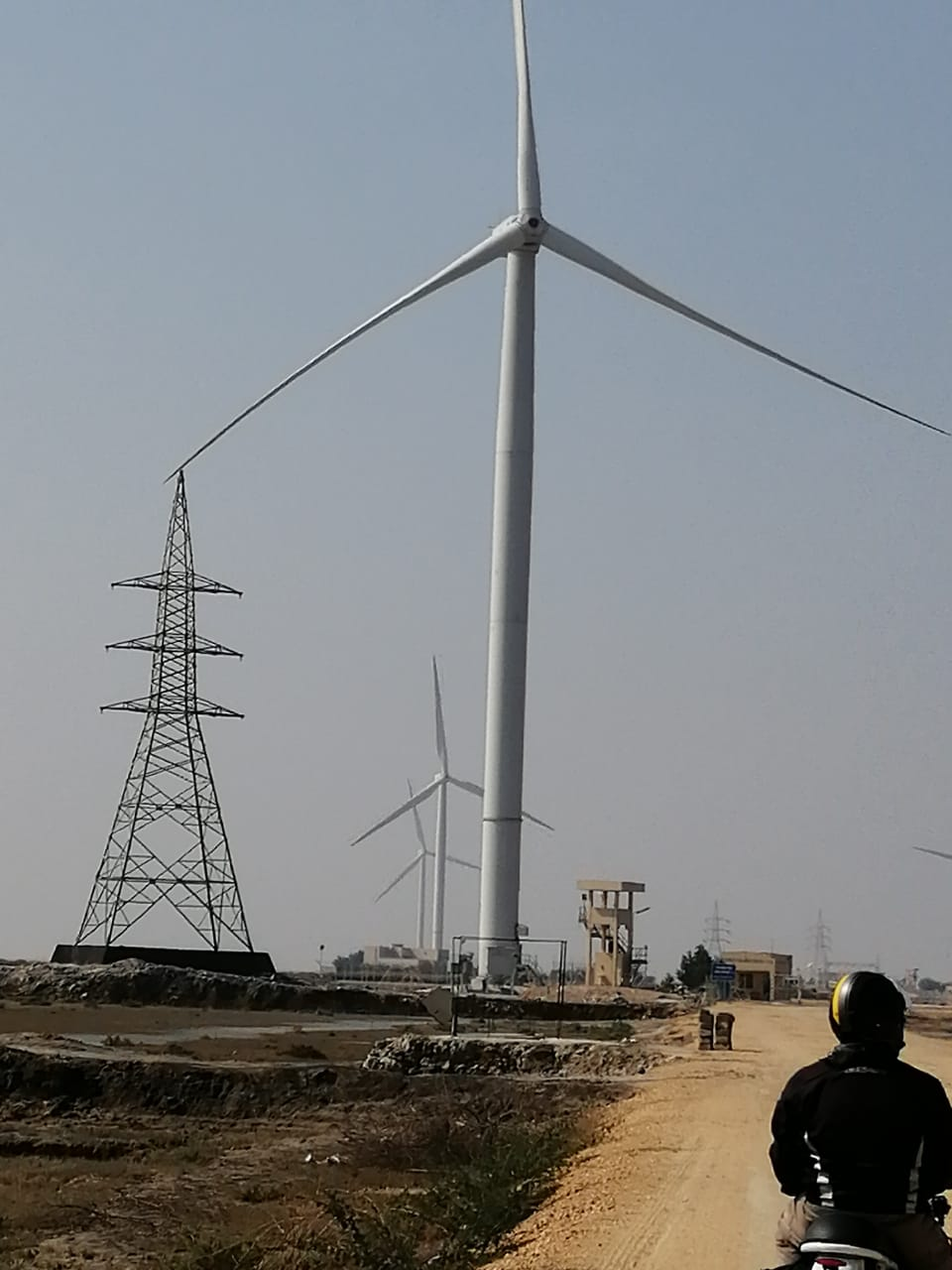
Windmills at Gharo

Pakistan is developing wind power plants in Jhimpir, Gharo, Keti Bandar and Bin Qasim in Sindh. The government of Pakistan decided to develop wind power energy sources due to problems supplying energy to the southern coastal regions of Sindh and Balochistan, the project was undertaken with assistance from the government of China. Another area with potential is Swat which shows good wind conditions in windpower investment. The Chagai District in Balochistan has good potential for wind power in the Nukundi area near the Afghan/Iran Border, with wind speeds often 12.5% higher than average required for energy generation.

Some examples are:

- Jhimpir Wind Power Plant (operational)
- Gharo Wind Power Plant (operational)
- Bin Qasim Wind Power Project (under construction)
- Artistic Energy (Pvt.) Ltd. (operational)
- Artistic Wind Power (Pvt.) Ltd. (operational)

== Microhydropower ==
More than 3000 MW of microhydropower potential exists in Pakistan, but only 150 MW has been utilized so far. The T15 turbine, which meets international standards, is currently being used locally.

== Tidal power ==
Tidal power has not yet been operational in Pakistan compared to other renewable energy technologies. In Sindh, two sites, creek system of Indus delta of 170 km and two to five metres tidal heights at the Korangi Creek, are available to exploit the tidal energy. Sonmiani Beach and Kalamat are also good prospects of tidal energy in Balochistan. The government issued licenses to private companies to develop tidal power stations in February 2013. Since then, engineering work has been underway, with an initial proposal for a 10 MW plant at Sonmiani Bay. Construction was originally expected to begin by the end of 2013.
