= Demirli, Babadağ =

Village in Turkey

Demirli
- Neighbourhood
- Location in Turkey Demirli (Turkey Aegean)
- Coordinates: 37°47′54″N 28°49′57″E
- Country: Turkey
- Province: Denizli
- District: Babadağ
- Population (2022): 81
- Time zone: UTC+3 (TRT)

Demirli is a neighbourhood in the municipality and district of Babadağ, Denizli Province in Turkey. Its population is 81 (2022).
