= Yeniköy, Babadağ =

Village in Turkey

Yeniköy
- Neighbourhood
- Location in Turkey Yeniköy (Turkey Aegean)
- Coordinates: 37°48′16″N 28°52′30″E
- Country: Turkey
- Province: Denizli
- District: Babadağ
- Population (2022): 325
- Time zone: UTC+3 (TRT)

Yeniköy is a neighbourhood in the municipality and district of Babadağ, Denizli Province in Turkey. Its population is 325 (2022). Recently it was reported that wildfires were nearby the neighborhood.
