= Ahmet Nazif Zorlu =

Turkish billionaire businessman (1944–2026)

- Born: 28 August 1944; Babadağ, Denizli, Turkey
- Died: 2 November 2026 (aged 82); Istanbul, Turkey
- Occupation: Chairman of Zorlu Holding
- Children: 3
- Relatives: Hacı Mehmet Zorlu

Ahmet Nazif Zorlu (28 August 1944 – 2 November 2026) was a Turkish billionaire businessman, who was the chairman of Zorlu Holding.

== Life and career ==
Ahmet Nazif Zorlu was born in Babadağ, Turkey, on 28 August 1944. He attended primary school at Gazi İlkokulu in Izmir. Zorlu began working in the business of his father Hacı Mehmet Zorlu, a textile factory. Ahmet Nazif Zorlu and his brother Zeki Zorlu expanded the business in 1960, by opening a store in Trabzon, and one in Istanbul later in 1966. Zorlu noted a gap in the textile market, and began producing patterned bed sheets under the TAÇ brand, and later produced the first king-sized bed sheets in Turkey.

In 2017, Zorlu was listed by Forbes as one of the richest men in Turkey, with an estimated US$1.3 billion fortune.

Zorlu died from cancer in Istanbul, on 2 November 2026, at the age of 82. Two days later, he was buried at Zincirlikuyu Cemetery.

== See also ==
- List of Turkish billionaires by net worth
- Zorlu Holding
