= Kelleci, Babadağ =

Village in Turkey

Kelleci
- Neighbourhood
- Location in Turkey Kelleci (Turkey Aegean)
- Coordinates: 37°48′18″N 28°54′09″E
- Country: Turkey
- Province: Denizli
- District: Babadağ
- Population (2022): 1,473
- Time zone: UTC+3 (TRT)

Kelleci is a neighbourhood in the municipality and district of Babadağ, Denizli Province in Turkey. Its population is 1,473 (2022).
