= Babadağ (mountain, Denizli) =

Mountain in Turkey

Babadağ (Gok Tepe, Karcı Dağı)
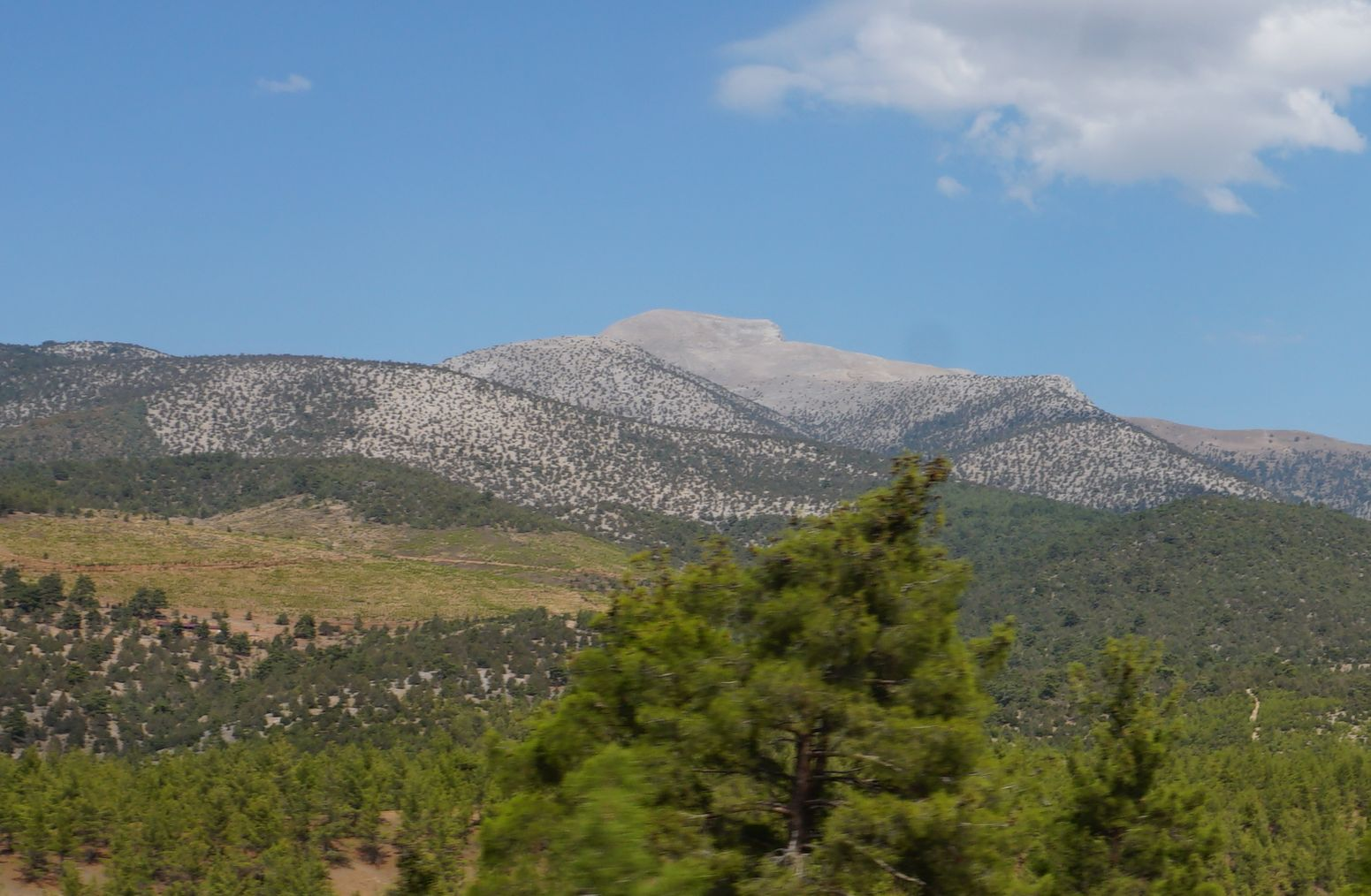
- Babadag from the south

Highest point
- Elevation: 2,308 m (7,572 ft)
- Prominence: 1,178 m (3,865 ft)
- Coordinates: 37°43′55″N 28°52′41″E

Geography
- Location within Turkey
- Location: Denizli Province, Turkey

Babadağ in Denizli Province is one of two mountains in Turkey with the same name, which translates into English as "Father Mountain". The other Babadağ mountain is in Muğla Province on the Aegean Sea. Both are part of the Taurus Mountains. The summit of the Babadağ in Denizli Province is located 23 km away in southwestern direction from Denizli, the capital of the province.

The mountain has a principal summit at an elevation of 2,308 metres (7,572 ft), a prominence of 1,178 metres (3,865 ft), and an isolation of 36.37 kilometres (23 miles), which is limited by Mount Honaz to the east. The summit of Babadağ is covered by snow yearlong.

On the northern slope of the mountain − at an altitude of about 800 m − is the town Babadağ named after the mountain.

The area is characterized by the existence of geological fault zones, which have contributed in the past to the occurrence of many landslides. The high risk of landslides in conjunction with seismic activity has led to the evacuation of a substantial part of the town of Babadağ in 2006 and to a relocation of many of the former inhabitants to the Denizli.

== Photographs ==
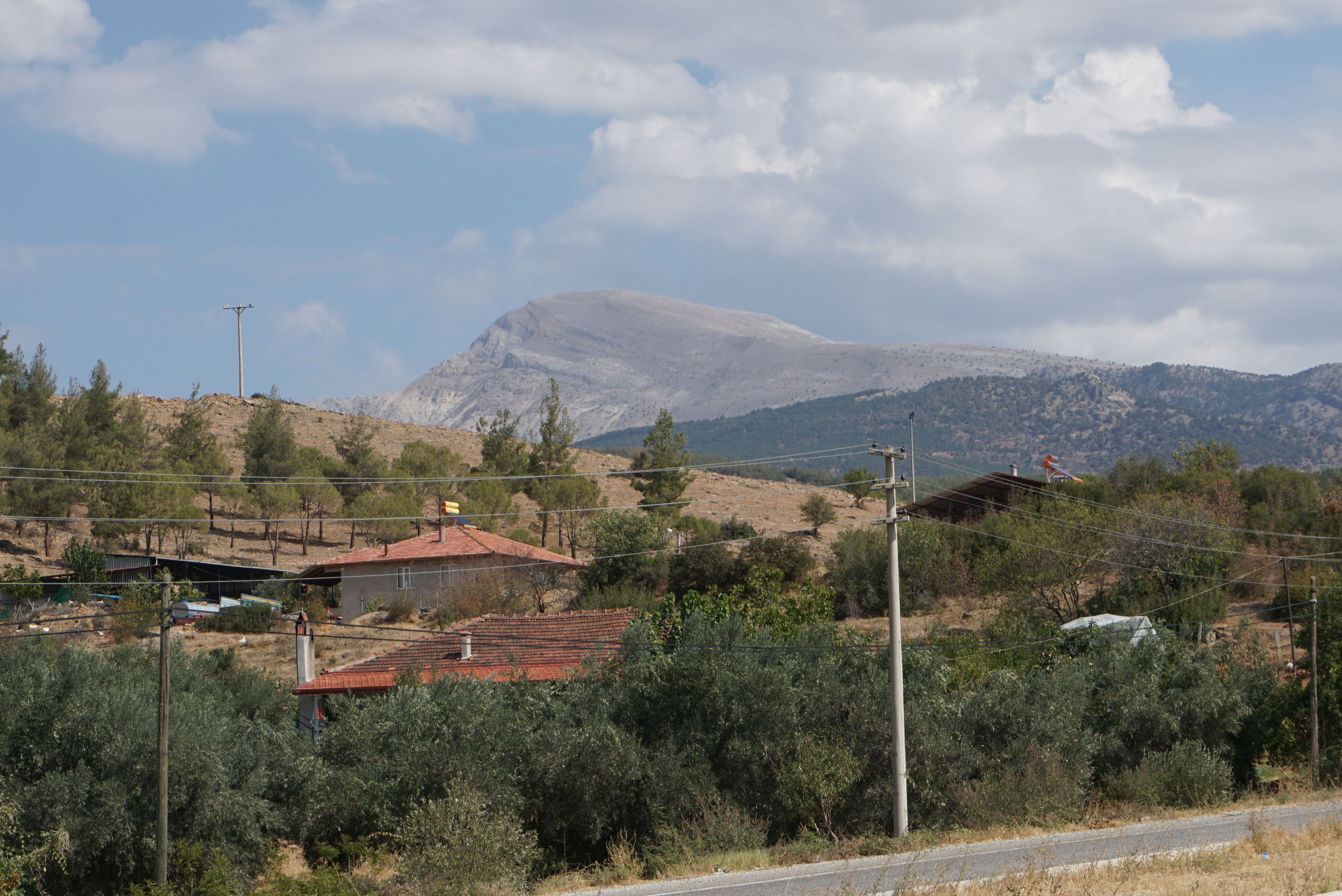
View from the west

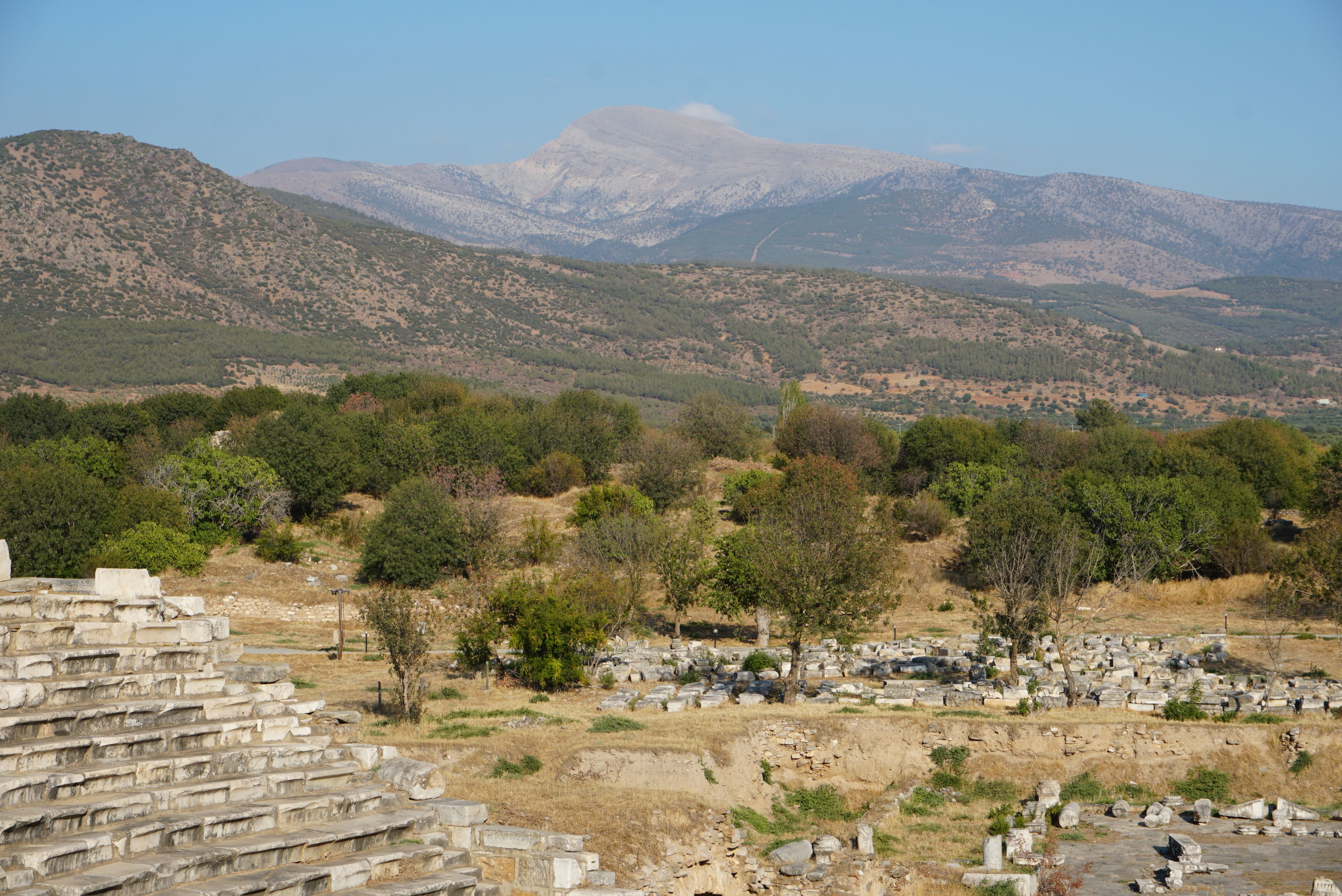
View from the west, from the hill above the theater of Aphrodisias

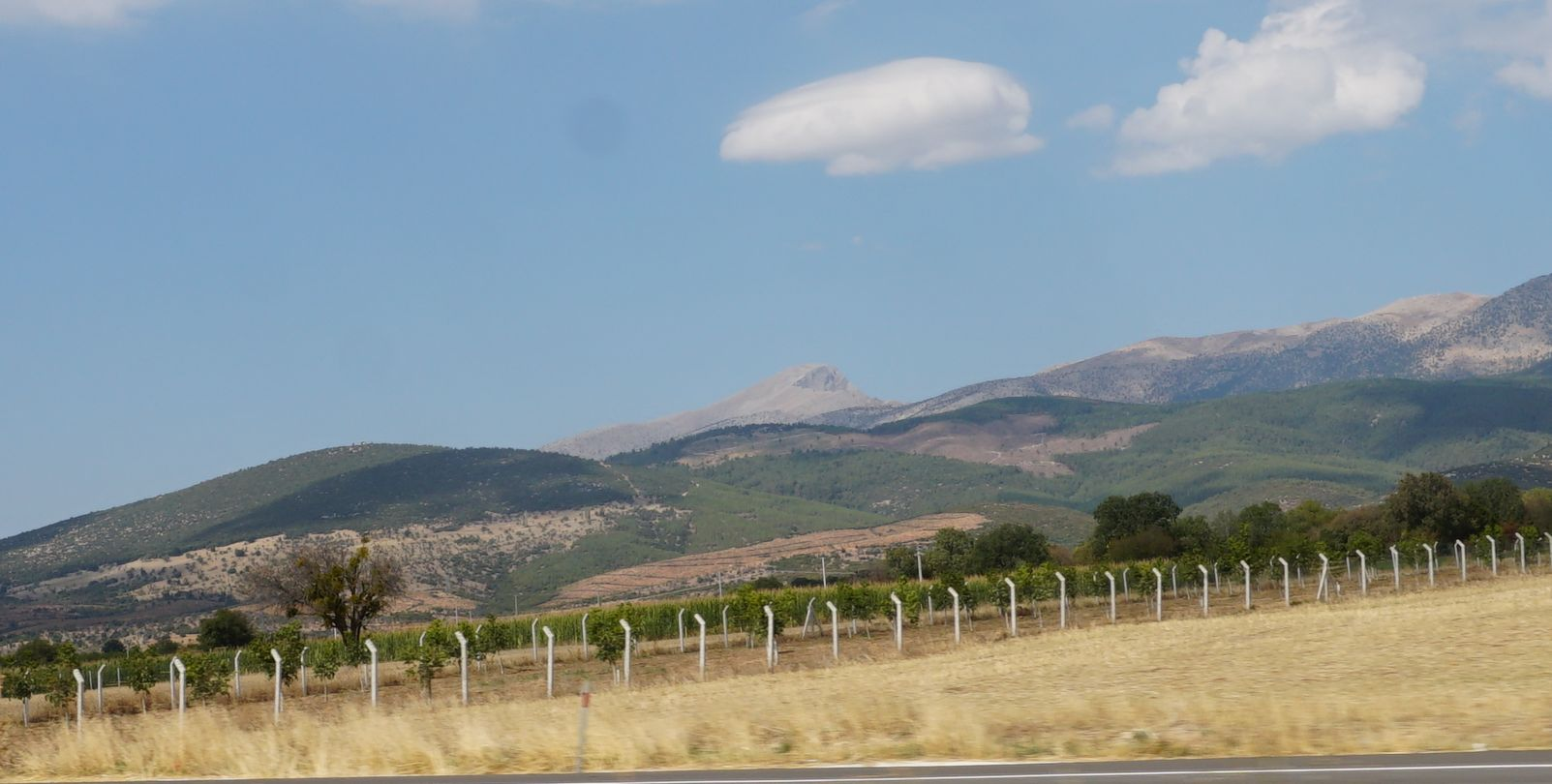
View from southwest

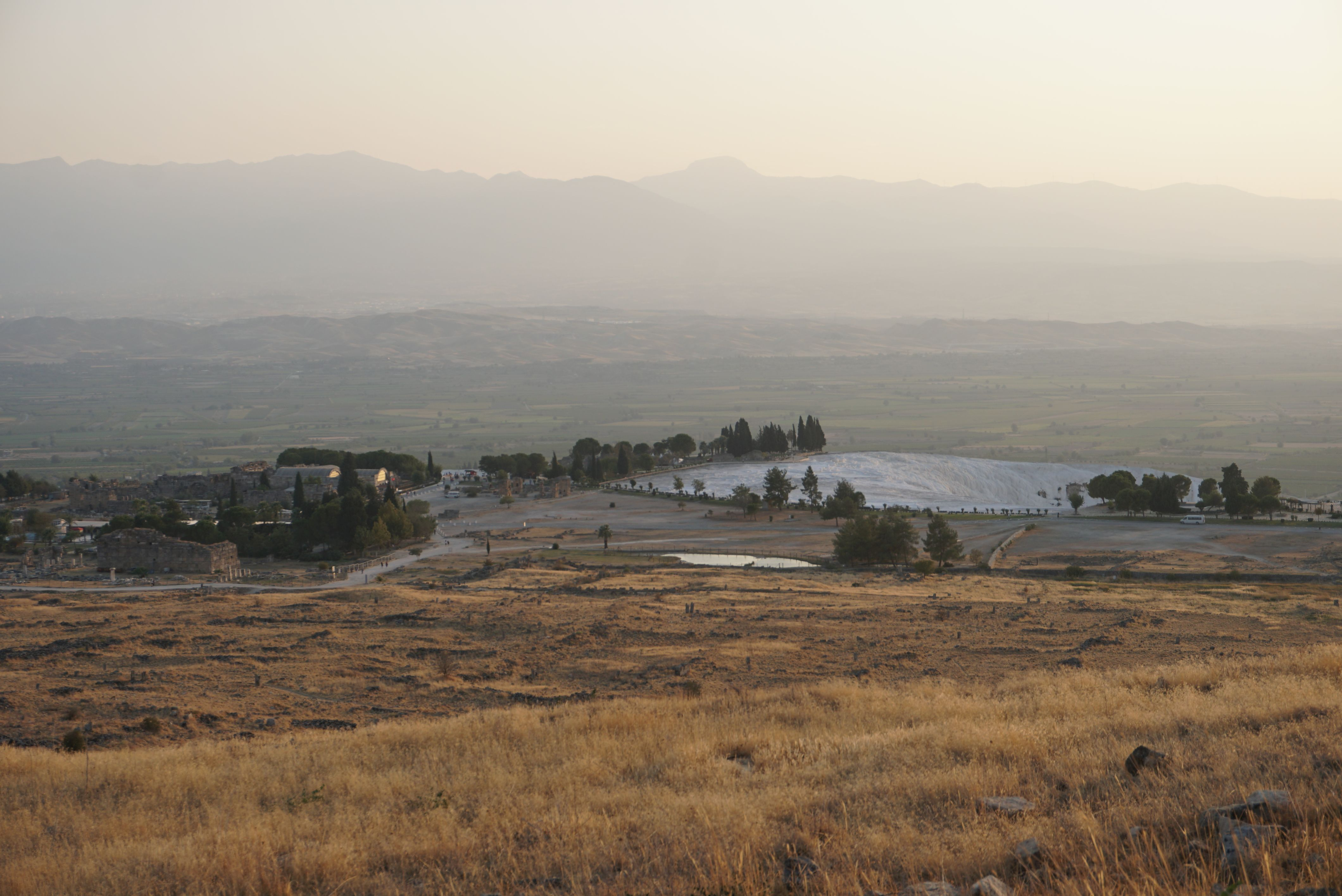
View from northeast, from the hills above Pamukkale
