= Mollaahmetler, Babadağ =

Village in Turkey

Mollaahmetler
- Neighbourhood
- Location in Turkey Mollaahmetler (Turkey Aegean)
- Coordinates: 37°48′07″N 28°55′52″E
- Country: Turkey
- Province: Denizli
- District: Babadağ
- Population (2022): 851
- Time zone: UTC+3 (TRT)

Mollaahmetler (also: Mollaahmet) is a neighbourhood in the municipality and district of Babadağ, Denizli Province in Turkey. Its population is 851 (2022).
