= Abdul Razak Dawood =

Pakistani industrialist

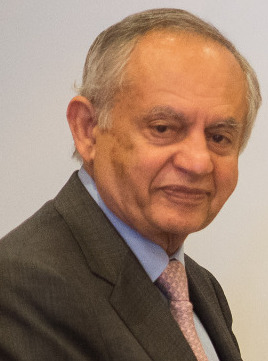

Advisor for Commerce and Investment 𝘸𝘪𝘵𝘩 𝘵𝘩𝘦 𝘴𝘵𝘢𝘵𝘶𝘴 𝘰𝘧 𝘍𝘦𝘥𝘦𝘳𝘢𝘭 𝘔𝘪𝘯𝘪𝘴𝘵𝘦𝘳
- In office 20 August 2018 – 10 April 2022
- President: Arif Alvi
- Prime Minister: Imran Khan
- Preceded by: Shamshad Akhtar (caretaker)

Advisor for Textile and Industry & Production 𝘸𝘪𝘵𝘩 𝘵𝘩𝘦 𝘴𝘵𝘢𝘵𝘶𝘴 𝘰𝘧 𝘍𝘦𝘥𝘦𝘳𝘢𝘭 𝘔𝘪𝘯𝘪𝘴𝘵𝘦𝘳
- In office 20 August 2018 – 6 April 2020
- President: Arif Alvi
- Prime Minister: Imran Khan
- Preceded by: Shamshad Akhtar (caretaker)
- Succeeded by: Hammad Azhar

Federal Minister for Commerce
- In office 6 November 1999 – 23 November 2002
- Chief Executive: Pervez Musharraf
- Preceded by: Ishaq Dar
- Succeeded by: Humayun Akhtar Khan

Personal details
- Spouse: Bilquis Dawood
- Children: 3
- Parent: Suleman Dawood (father)
- Education: Newcastle University; Columbia University

Abdul Razak Dawood is a Pakistani businessman who founded Descon and served as its chief executive officer (CEO) until 2018. He was the Federal Minister of Commerce, Industries & Production between 1999 and 2002 in the Pervez Musharraf administration and later served as the Adviser for Commerce and Investment to then-Prime Minister Imran Khan from 2018 until 2022.

== Early life and education ==
After initial schooling in the UK, Dawood studied and graduated in mining engineering from the Newcastle University. In 1968 he obtained his master's degree in business administration (MBA) from the Columbia University.

He is a nephew of the late Seth Ahmed Dawood (1905–2002) who was considered one of the pioneering industrialists of Pakistan.

== Business career ==
Dawood began his career in the family business at Lawrencepur Woolen and Textile Mills in 1968 and later joined Dawood Hercules Chemical Limited as the managing director where he served until 1981.

In 1977, Dawood founded Descon. After his father and the siblings decided by the late 1970s and early 1980s to part ways, he became the CEO and chairman of Descon, a position he held until 2018. He is also a member of the Karachi Chamber of Commerce and Industry.

== Academic career ==
Dawood was a visiting faculty member in 1975 till 1981 at the newly established MBA Programme at the University of Punjab. In the early 1980s, he established the Suleman Dawood School of Business at the Lahore University of Management Sciences (LUMS) and has served as a member of the board of trustees of the university.

Dawood is also the founder of the Bilquis and Abdul Razak Dawood (BARD) Foundation, a non-profit organization based in Lahore.
