= Ahıllı, Babadağ =

Village in Turkey

Ahıllı
- Neighbourhood
- Location in Turkey Ahıllı (Turkey Aegean)
- Coordinates: 37°49′03″N 28°50′43″E
- Country: Turkey
- Province: Denizli
- District: Babadağ
- Population (2022): 60
- Time zone: UTC+3 (TRT)

Ahıllı is a neighbourhood in the municipality and district of Babadağ, Denizli Province in Turkey. Its population is 60 (2022).
