= Kıranyer, Babadağ =

Village in Turkey

Kıranyer
- Neighbourhood
- Location in Turkey Kıranyer (Turkey Aegean)
- Coordinates: 37°48′45″N 28°49′10″E
- Country: Turkey
- Province: Denizli
- District: Babadağ
- Population (2022): 62
- Time zone: UTC+3 (TRT)

Kıranyer is a neighbourhood in the municipality and district of Babadağ, Denizli Province in Turkey. Its population is 62 (2022).
