= Bekirler, Babadağ =

Village in Turkey

Bekirler
- Neighbourhood
- Location in Turkey Bekirler (Turkey Aegean)
- Coordinates: 37°49′58″N 28°54′54″E
- Country: Turkey
- Province: Denizli
- District: Babadağ
- Population (2022): 429
- Time zone: UTC+3 (TRT)

Bekirler is a neighbourhood in the municipality and district of Babadağ, Denizli Province in Turkey. Its population is 429 (2022).
