= Oğuzlar, Babadağ =

Village in Turkey

Oğuzlar
- Neighbourhood
- Location in Turkey Oğuzlar (Turkey Aegean)
- Coordinates: 37°49′44″N 28°53′09″E
- Country: Turkey
- Province: Denizli
- District: Babadağ
- Population (2022): 54
- Time zone: UTC+3 (TRT)

Oğuzlar is a neighbourhood in the municipality and district of Babadağ, Denizli Province in Turkey. Its population is 54 (2022).
