= Gharo =

Gharo گھارو
- Town
- Location within Sindh Location within Pakistan
- Coordinates: 24°44′29″N 67°35′09″E
- Country: Pakistan
- Province: Sindh
- District: Thatta
- Taluka: Mirpur Sakro
- Time zone: UTC+5 (PST)

Gharo (Urdu/Sindhi: گھارو) is a town located in Thatta District, Sindh, Pakistan. Its population is about 2.000 families in 2017.

It has a large bazaar for the local communities, sits on the delta of the Indus River, and its economy is based on fishing and agriculture. It also has a school situated in New Dhabeji.

The Gharo Wind Power Plant is being built near Gharo.

== See also ==
- Marho Kotri Wildlife Sanctuary
