= Muzaffargarh solar power project =

Proposed 600 MW solar power plant

Muzaffargarh Solar Power Project
- Country: Pakistan
- Location: Muzaffargarh
- Status: Proposed

Solar farm
- Type: Flat-panel PV
- Total collector area: 2,400 acres

Power generation
- Units planned: 1
- Nameplate capacity: 600MW

The Muzaffargarh Solar Power Project is a proposed 600 MW solar power plant to be installed in Muzaffargarh, Pakistan. The project is part of the government's initiative to generate low-cost and environment-friendly electricity.

The project was launched as a component of the government's strategy to generate 10,000 MW of solar power nationwide. The primary objective was to lower electricity costs by phasing out load-based power plants that operate on imported fuel during daylight hours. The initial pilot project of 600 MW was set in motion in Muzaffargarh.

== Land acquisition ==
2400 acres of land was to be acquired for the Muzaffargarh project at an estimated cost of Rs 2000 crore. 1.4 billion. However, due to financial constraints, the Planning Commission refused to fund the land acquisition.

== Bidding ==
The project's bidding process faced a poor response from potential investors. Despite offering an appealing power tariff of 3.4 cents per unit, no bids were submitted for the project. This presented a setback, as the government did not receive any bids for the initial pilot project. Due to the poor response in the bidding process, the National Electric Power Regulatory Authority (NEPRA) intended to review the approved tariff for the project.
