= Babadağ, Denizli =

Babadağ
- District and municipality
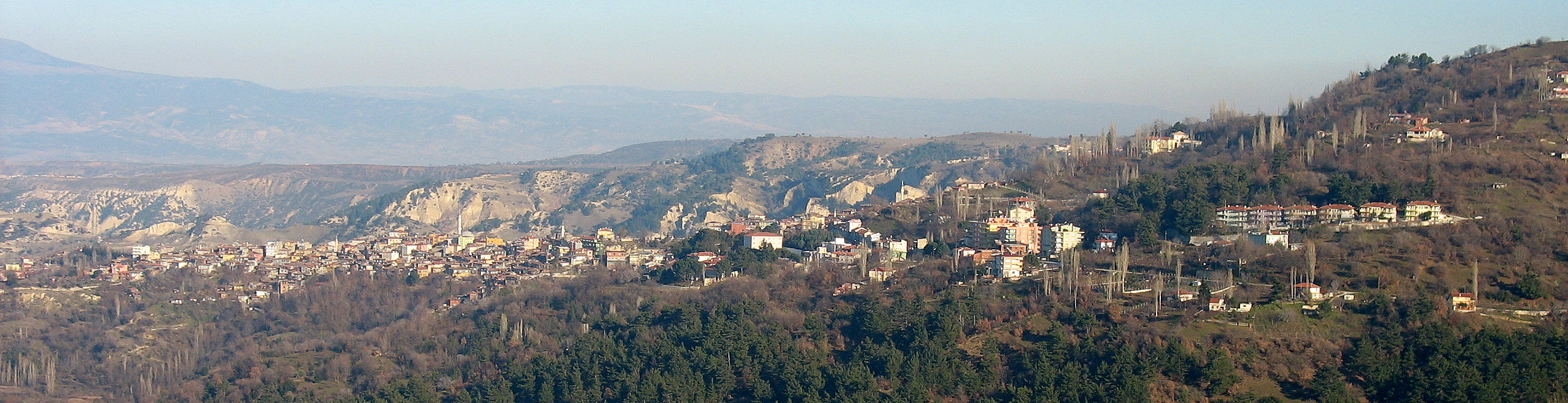

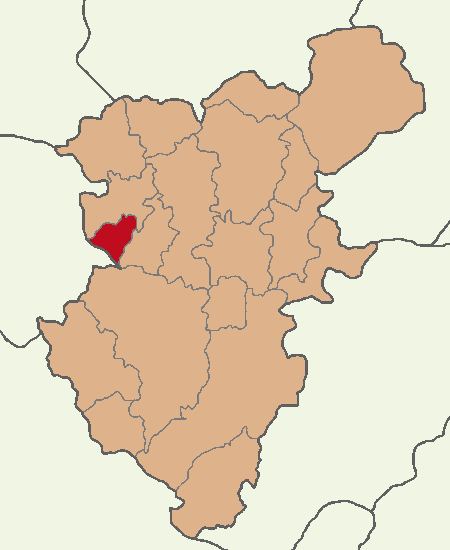
- Map showing Babadağ District in Denizli Province

- Location within Turkey Location within Turkey Aegean
- Coordinates: 37°48′25″N 28°51′22″E
- Country: Turkey
- Province: Denizli

Government
  - Mayor: Murat Kumral (AKP)
- Area: 124 km^{2} (48 sq mi)
- Population (2022): 6,340
  - Density: 51.1/km^{2} (132/sq mi)
- Time zone: UTC+3 (TRT)
- Postal code: 20480
- Area code: 0258
- Website: www.babadag.bel.tr

Babadağ, formerly Kadıköy, is a municipality and district of Denizli Province, Turkey. Its area is 124 km^{2}, and its population is 6,340 (2022). It is a highland town, reached by a steep, winding road uphill from the town of Sarayköy. It was known in antiquity as Salbacos.

Agriculture is difficult on the mountainous terrain around Babadağ. As a result, many residents have long made a living from clothing production and sewing, while others have migrated to Denizli, İzmir and Istanbul. Thus this is the hometown of many of Denizli's traders and textile entrepreneurs. Babadağ dollar is Denizli slang for the expression my word is my bond. There are still active workshops in the town, which is also a popular mountain summer holiday location.

The area is characterized by the existence of geological fault zones, which have contributed in the past to the occurrence of many landslides. There was also a high risk of landslides in town, which led the government to evacuate Gündoğdu, a steeply sloped urban district of Babadağ, in 2006. The homes of about 2000 persons were destroyed to prevent uncontrolled return of their former inhabitants, many of whom relocated to newly built houses in the provincial capital Denizli.

In 2019, a large wind park was built on the mountain crest southwest of Babadağ. The towers are visible from many locations in town. The wind park runs along the border between the provinces Denizli und Aydın and is known as Denizli Wind Power Plant. It consists of 22 wind turbines with a total installed power of 74.8 MW. The project was co-financed by the European Bank for Reconstruction and Development. The plant was built by Siemens Gamesa and went on the power grid in 2019/2020. It is operated by the Turkish company Akfen Renewable Energy as part of Akfen Holding.

== Composition ==
There are 12 neighbourhoods in Babadağ District:

- Ahıllı
- Bekirler
- Cumhuriyet
- Demirli
- Gazi
- Gündoğdu
- İncirpınar
- Kelleci
- Kıranyer
- Mollaahmetler
- Oğuzlar
- Yeniköy

== Notable natives ==
- Hacı Mehmet Zorlu (1919 in Babadağ, Denizli – 7. Mai 2005 in Istanbul), originally a weaver, later founder of a company dealing in textiles, from which the conglomerate Zorlu Holding developed, one of the largest industry enterprises in Turkey.
- Ahmet Nazif Zorlu (* 1944), son of Mehmet Zorlu, in 2021 Chairman of the Board of Zorlu Holding.
- Zeki Zorlu (* 1939), son of Mehmet Zorlu, in 2021 Vice Chairman of Zorlu Holding.

== Gallery ==
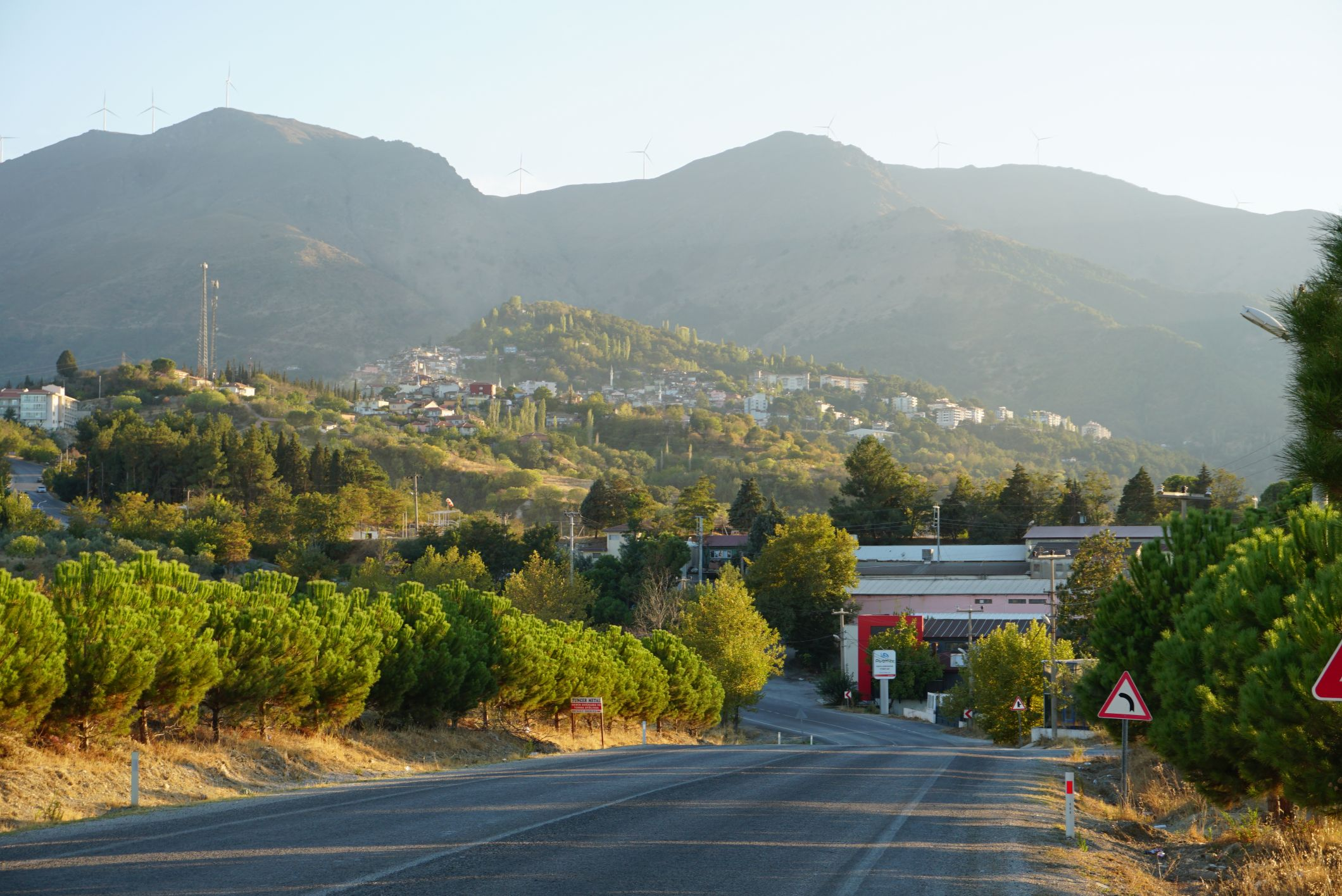
Babadağ from the north (picture taken in 2021 on Babadağ Sarayköy Yolu). On the mountain crest in the background, one sees the towers of the wind park.

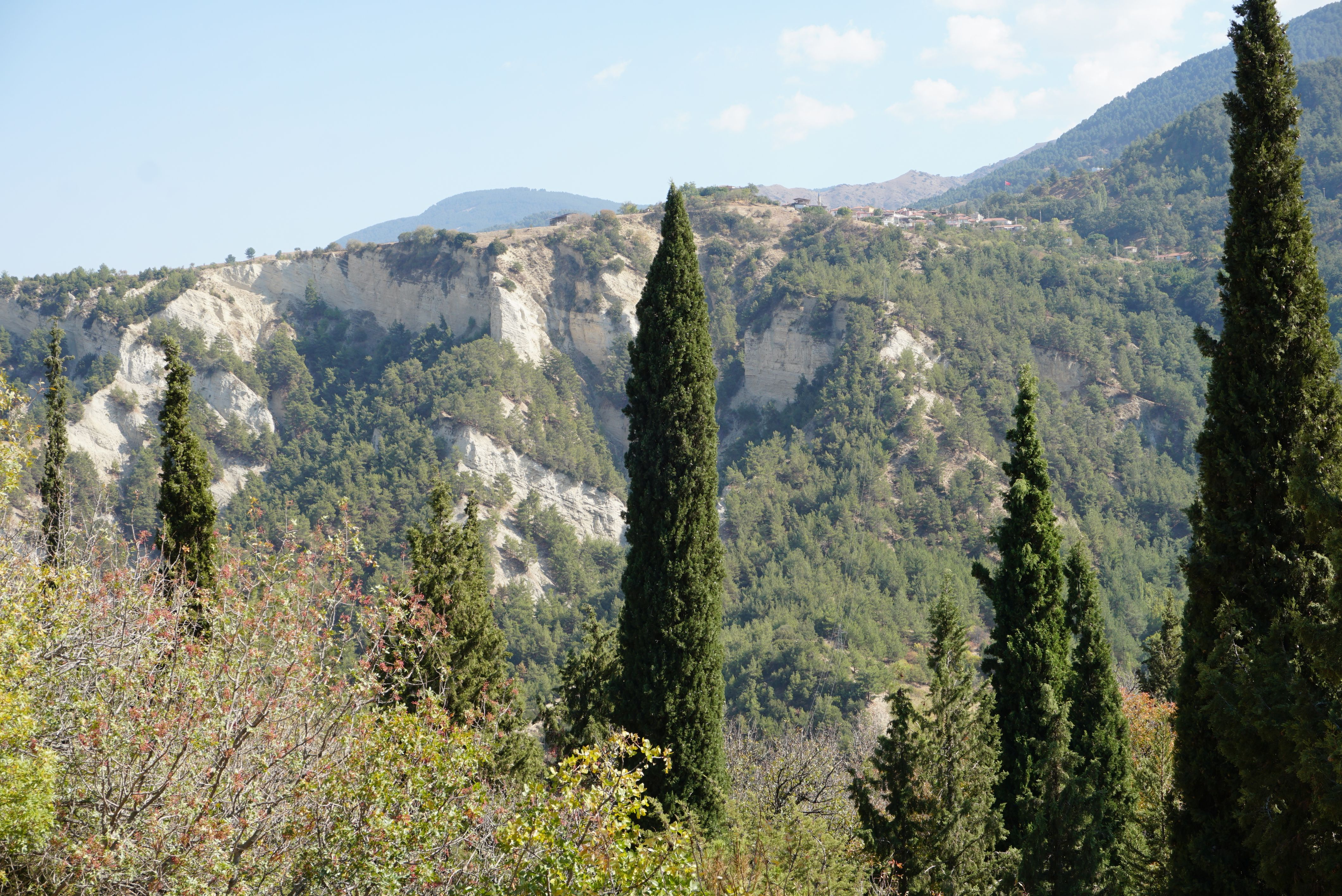
Eastern slope of the gorge in the north of Babadağ (picture taken at the cemetery which is located at the northern entrance to town)

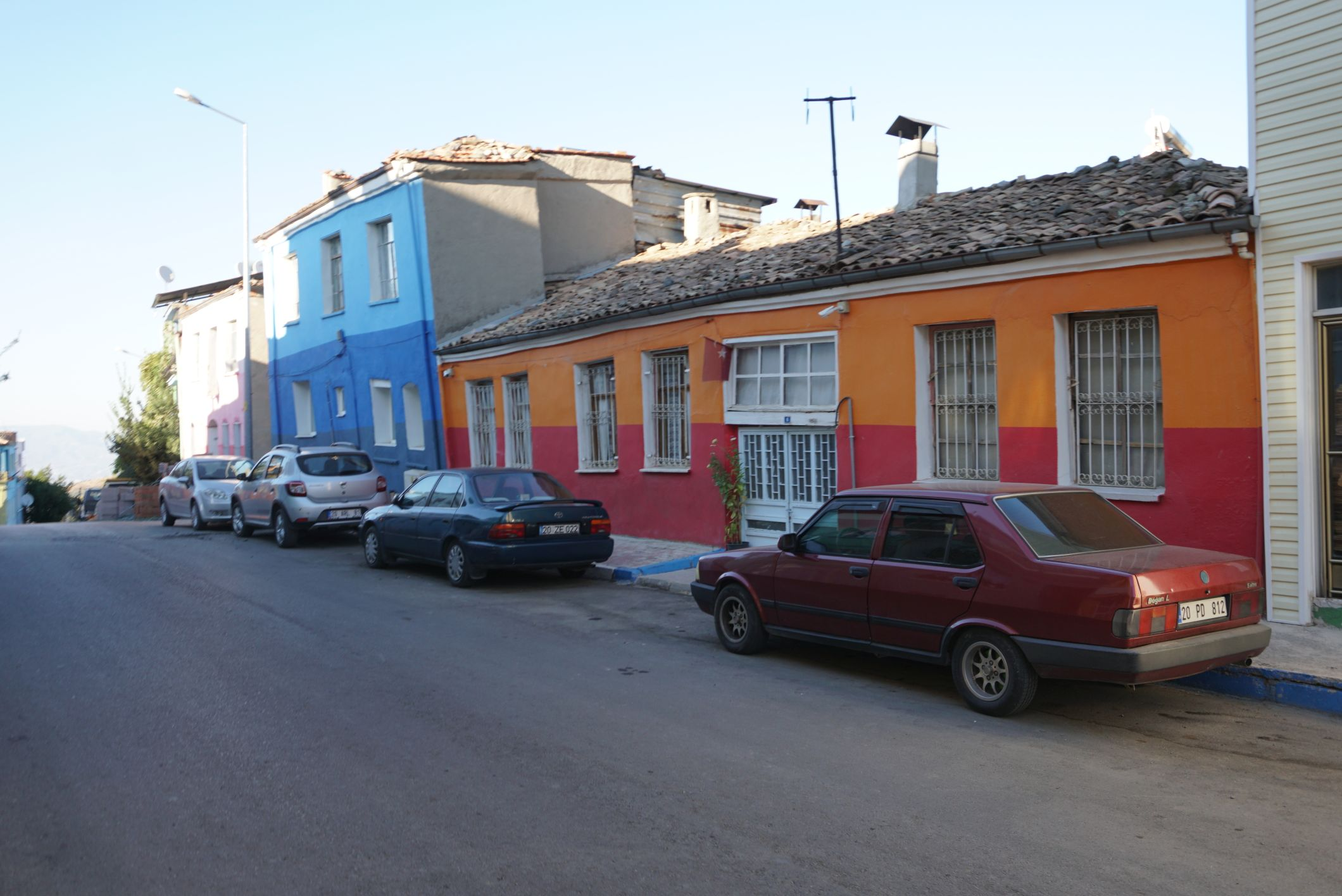
Houses in Mehmet Özer Cd. in the northern central district of town (2021)

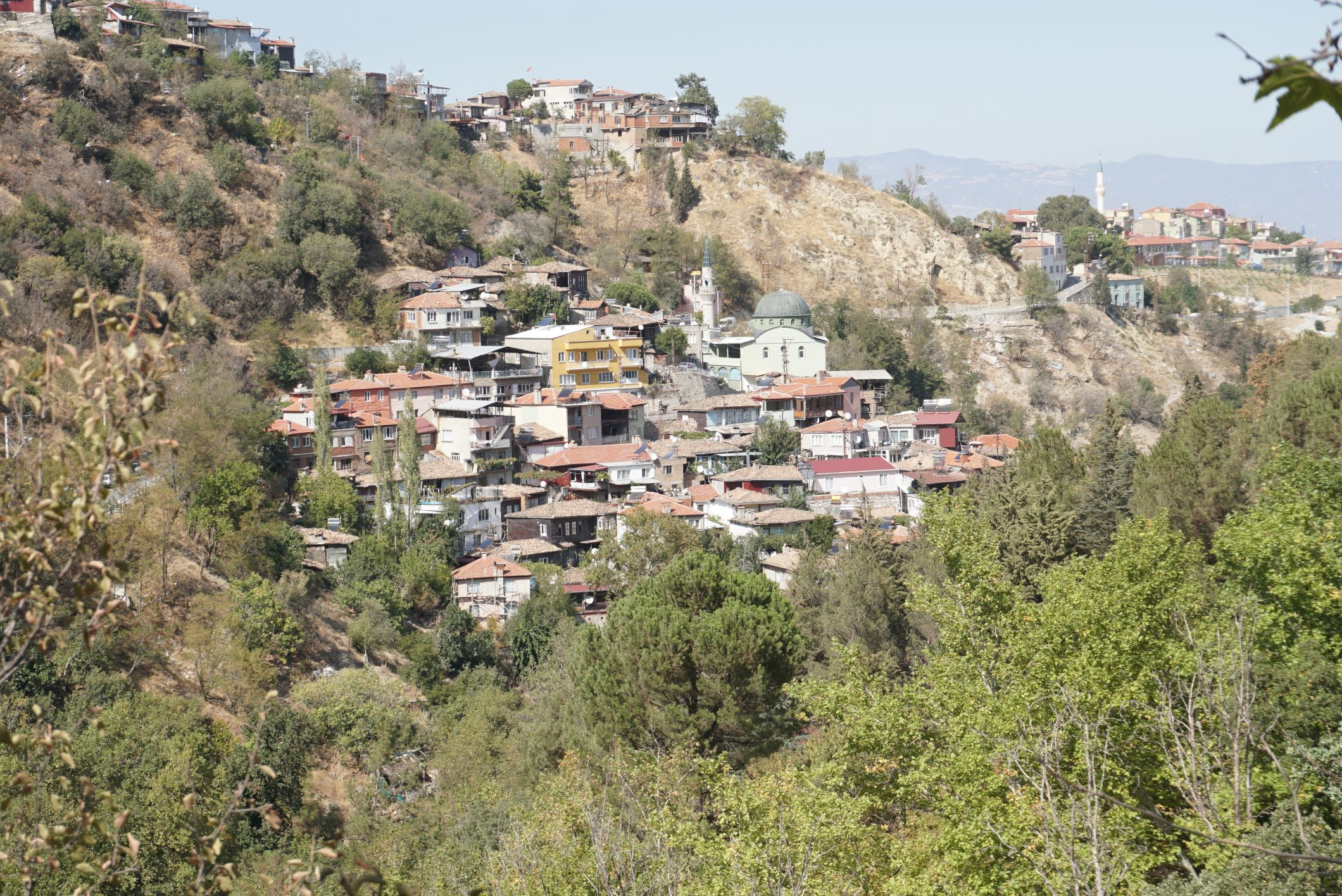
Ward on Istiklal Cd. on the southeastern end of Babadağ (2021)

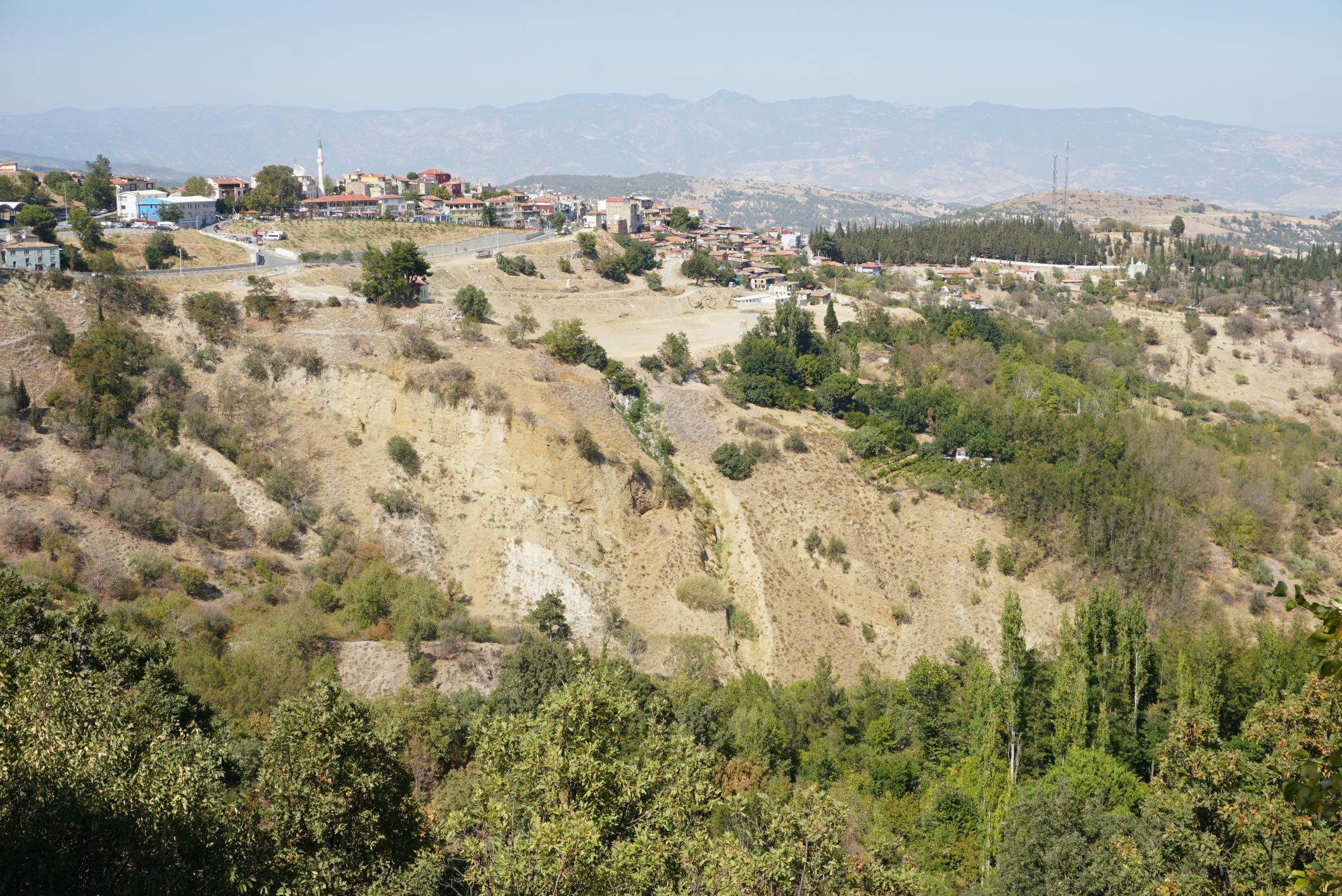
The evacuated region of Gündoğdu (central eastern part of town, 2021)

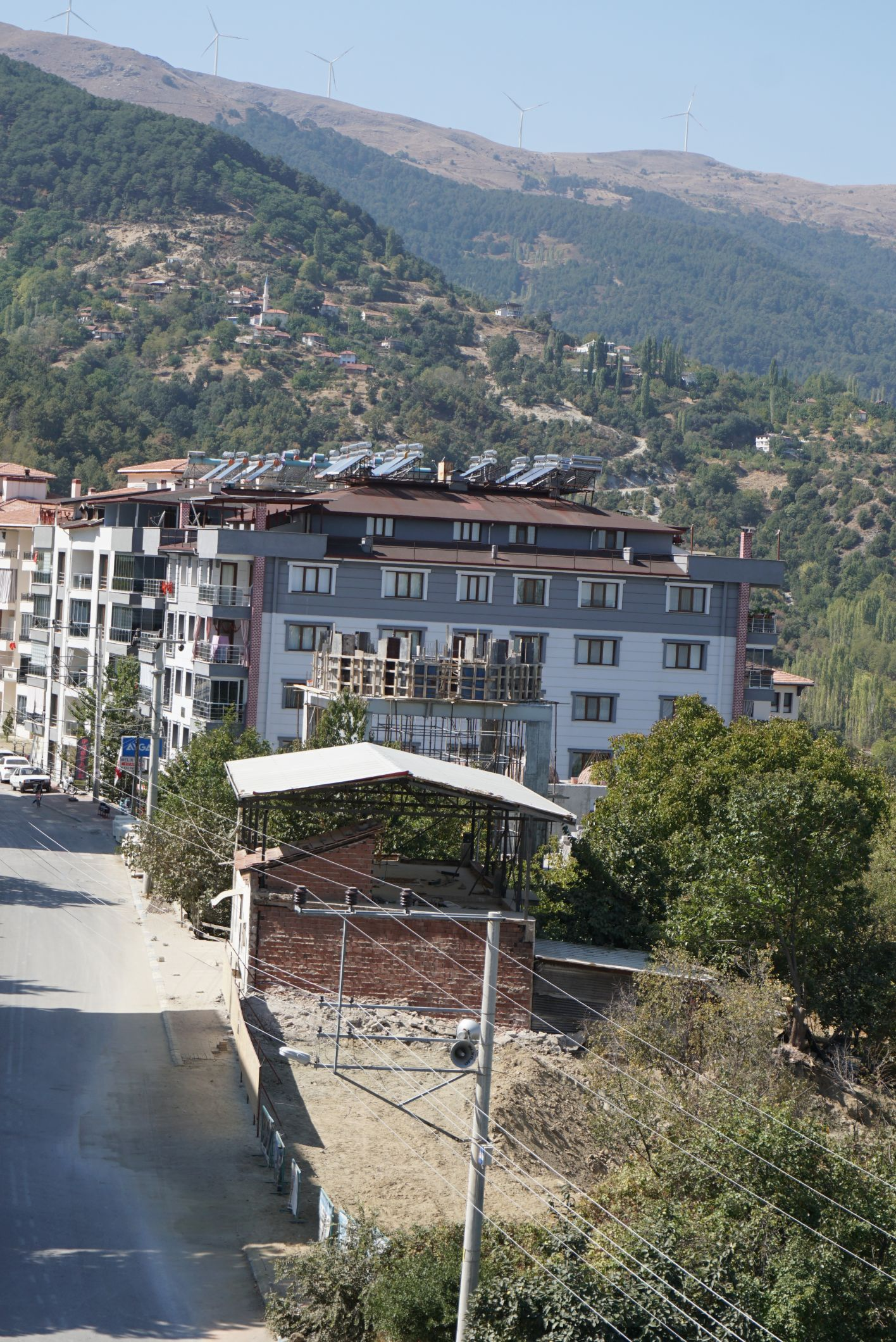
New houses on Hacı Mehmet Zorlu Cd. in the southwest part of town (2021) to which several of the evacuated families relocated from Denizli.
