= Descon =

Corporate group based in Lahore

- Logo since 2008
- Type: Corporate group
- Industry: Conglomerate
- Founded: 15 December 1977; 48 years ago
- Founder: Abdul Razak Dawood
- Headquarters: Lahore, Pakistan
- Area served: Worldwide
- Key people: Taimur Dawood chairman; Taimur Saeed (CEO); Asad Ashfaq (COO); Yasir Siddique (CFO)
- Number of employees: 22,000 (2023)
- Website: descon.com

Descon (Urdu pronunciation: [ˈdɛs.kɔn] DES-kon) is a group of companies headquartered in Lahore. It operates in the engineering, power and chemical sectors. Descon is active in UAE, Qatar, Azerbaijan, Saudi Arabia, Kuwait, Oman, Iraq, and South Africa.

== History ==
It was founded in 1977 by Abdul Razak Dawood as Design Engineering and Construction Services (Descon) with an investment of Rs. 3.2 million. It received its first contract when Attock Refinery asked to set up a small refinery in 1978. In 1981, it received a four-year project of National Refinery which helped the company to expand.

In 1982, Descon expanded to regional countries, where it helped a Saudi company and afterwards got a small project in Abu Dhabi.

In 2007, Descon was included in the Engineering News-Record's list.

In 2018, Descon expanded its footprint into South Africa by acquiring 26 percent of Plant Design and Project Services (PDPS), an engineering firm there.

== List of companies ==
=== Listed companies ===
- Altern Energy Limited
- Descon Oxychem Limited (founded 2004)

=== Unlisted companies ===
- Descon Engineering Qatar (LLC) (founded 2002): A Qatari branch of Descon
- Descon Plant Design and Project Services (PDPS): A division of Descon Engineering formed through a strategic acquisition of a 26% stake in a South African PDPS company
- Olayan Descon Industrial Company (ODI) (founded 1981): A joint venture with Olayan Saudi Holding
- Presson Descon International Limited (PDIL)

== See also ==
- List of companies of Pakistan
- Pearl GTL
