= Hacı Mehmet Zorlu =

- Born: November 23, 1919; Babadağ, Denizli
- Died: 2005; Istanbul, Turkey
- Occupation: Business man
- Known for: Founder of Zorlu Holding, one of the biggest group of companies in Turkey.

Hacı Mehmet Zorlu (1919 in Babadağ, Denizli – May 7, 2005 in Istanbul) was the founder of Zorlu Holding, one of the biggest group of companies in Turkey.
