= Zorlu Energy Wind Power Project =

Wind farm in Pakistan

Zorlu Energy Power Project
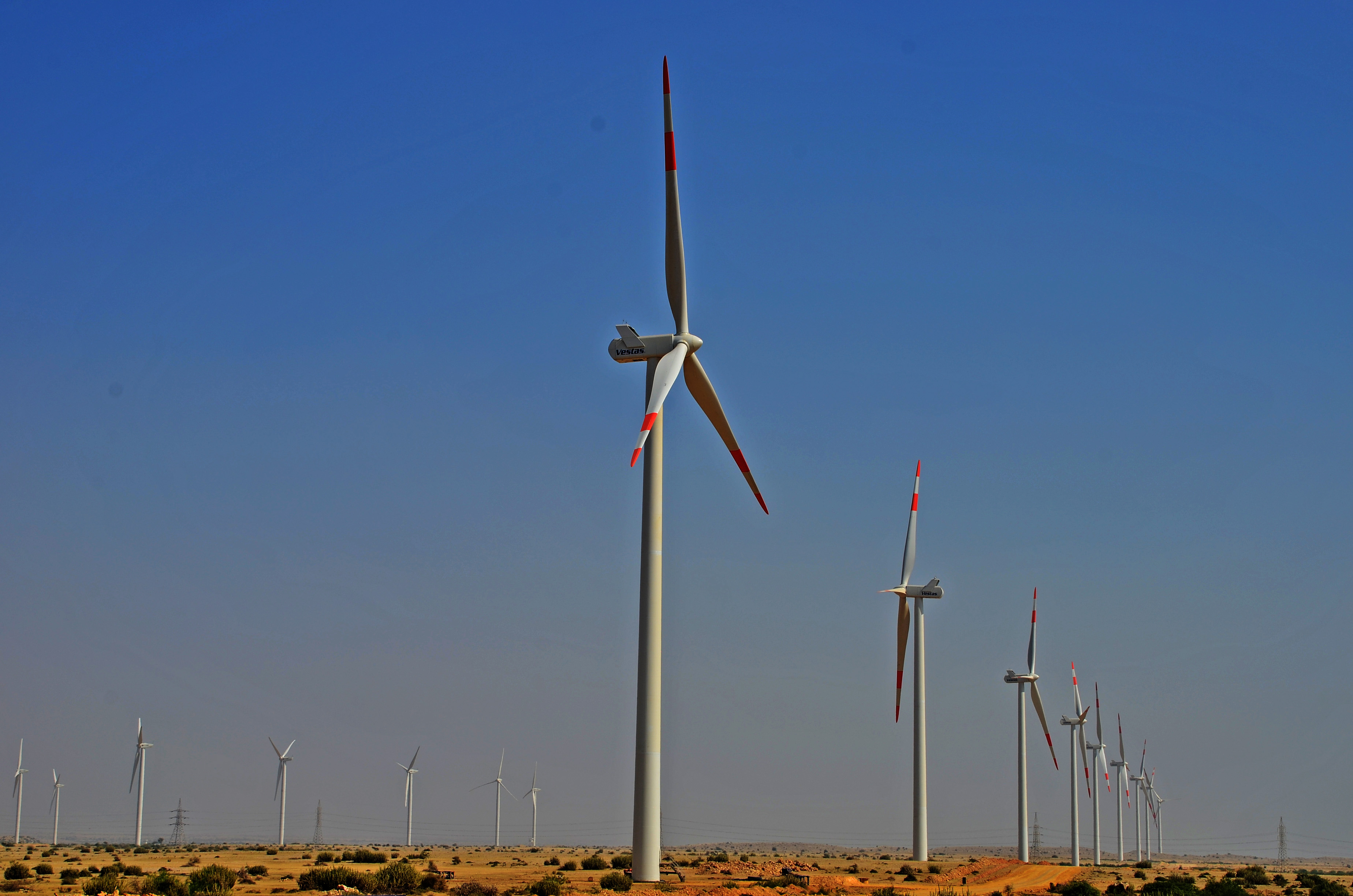
- Country: Pakistan
- Location: Thatta, Sindh
- Coordinates: 25°03′08.1″N 67°59′23.8″E
- Commission date: 2009
- Construction cost: $143 million

External links
- Website: https://jhimpirpower.com/

The Zorlu Energy Power Project (Urdu: جھمپیر ہوا بجلی گھر, Sindhi: جھمپیر هوا بجلي گھر) is a wind farm located at Jhimpir in Thatta District of Sindh province in Pakistan, 120 kilometres north-east of Karachi. The project has been developed by Zorlu Energy Pakistan, a subsidiary of the Turkish firm Zorlu Enerji. The total cost of project was $143 million.

== History ==
In the first phase with overall generation capacity of 6 MW, five German-made gearless VENSYS 62 of Vensys wind turbines each capable of producing 1.2 MW were installed/connected with 11 kV HESCO network and started generation in April 2009.

In the second phase, 28 more wind turbines of 1.8 MW capacity each, supplied by Vestas of Denmark were installed to produce a total of 50.4 MW electricity. This increased the capacity of the project to 56.4 MW. The project was completed in March 2013.

In July 2013, Zorlu Enerji announced that its 56.4 MW Jhimpir wind power plant in Pakistan had started to sell power to the Pakistani national power distribution company after having passed all the required tests.

Currently the privately owned Turkish wind farm is selling the produced electricity to Pakistan at a rate of 12.1057 US cents per kilowatt hour of electricity.

As of June 2024, all five 'VENSYS 62' turbines have been non-operational for an extended period due to maintenance issues. This has reduced the total capacity of the wind plant to 50.4 MW. The primary reason for the problem is that the VENSYS 62 turbines were not designed to operate in the high temperatures experienced in Pakistan, which can reach up to 50°C in the summer.

Currently, 45 wind power projects of around 3200 MW capacity are under process in Pakistan.

== See also ==
- List of power stations in Pakistan
- List of dams and reservoirs in Pakistan
