= Jhimpir =

Human settlement in Pakistan

Jhimpir (Urdu: جھم پیر) is a village in Thatta District, Sindh, Pakistan. It is situated 114 km away from Karachi. It is the site of Pakistan's first wind power project. Jhimpir has a railway station and train service is available for Karachi and upcountry from here.

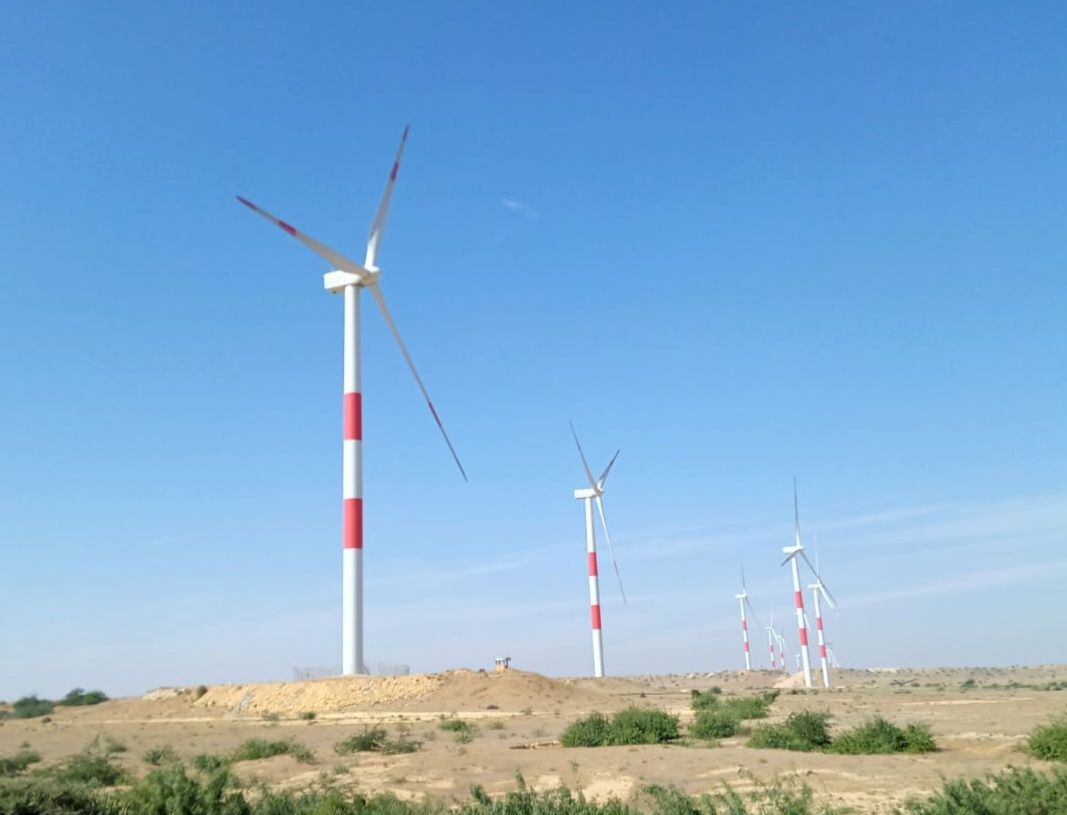
Jhimpir Wind Power project

The Jhimpir Wind Power Plant, located at Jhimpir, has been developed by Zorlu Energy Pakistan, a subsidiary of the Turkish firm Zorlu Enerji. The total cost of the project was $143 million. The energy production is 55 MW.
