= Zorlu Holding =

Turkish company

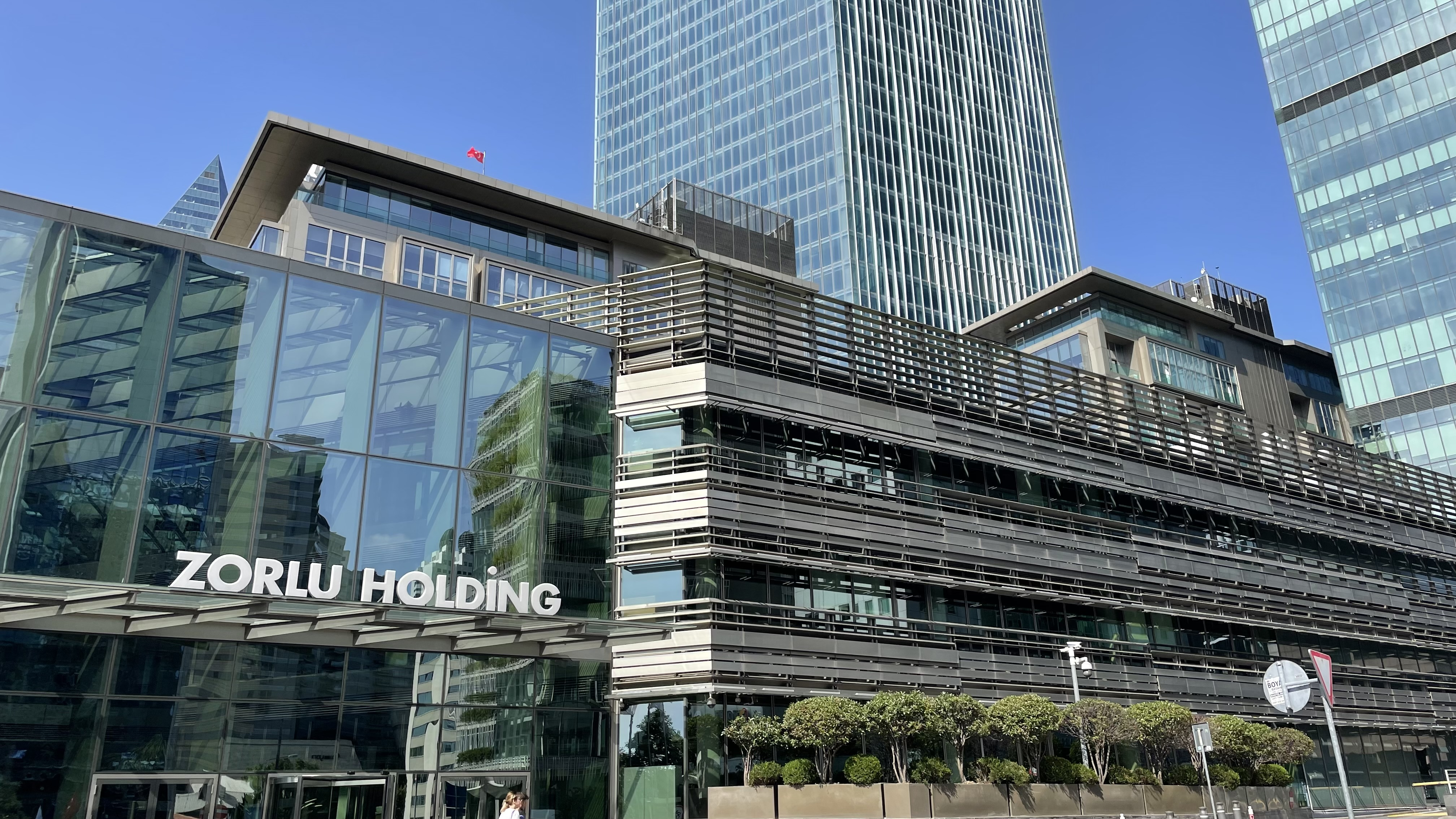
- Industry: Textiles, Mining and Metallurgy, Consumer Electronics, White Goods, Telecommunications, Energy, Real Estate, Aviation, Automotive
- Founder: Hacı Mehmet Zorlu
- Headquarters: Turkey
- Key people: Ahmet Nazif Zorlu, Zeki Zorlu, Olgun Zorlu, Emre Zorlu
- Revenue: ▲$9.3 billion (2022)
- Net income: ▲$173 million (2022)
- Total assets: ▲$18.9 billion (2022)
- Total equity: ▲$4.1 billion (2022)
- Owner: Zorlu family
- Number of employees: 36,000
- Website: www.zorlu.com.tr

Zorlu Holding is a Turkish multinational conglomerate holding specialized in textiles, white goods, electronics manufacturing, energy, and financial services. Zorlu Holding is headquartered in Istanbul.

== History ==
The Zorlu group was founded by Hacı Mehmet Zorlu.

Zorlu Holding acquired the electronics company Vestel in 1994.

In December 2006, the most important stakeholders of the Zorlu family sold $250 million worth of their main controlling companies (Zorlu Linen Dokuma, Linens Pazarlama, Korteks, ...) back to the Zorlu Holding. The shares of Ahmet Zorlu and his family members in the Zorlu Holding lowered from 51% to 49%. Those changes came as the holding sought to consolidate its activities and turn to the international.

In May 2011, the Zorlu Group selected the luxury hotel brand Raffles as the premium hospitality provider of the Zorlu Center, Turkey's first mixed-use project.

In September 2016, the group was in talks with the Iranian authorities to build gas-fired power plants in Iran. In November 2017, the Zorlu Group opened Turkey's first nickel and cobalt production facility, and Europe's first global-scale smartphone manufacturing plant.

In February 2018, the Zorlu Group signed a $4.5 billion deal with the Chinese GSR Capital to invest in battery production through its subsidiary Vestel and with a plan to build a 25,000 megawatt battery production factory on a 300,000 square meter area (which would provide batteries for 500,000 cars). Through this deal, GSR Capital took 50% of Meta Nikel Madencilik, a nickel production subsidiary of the Zorlu Group. In March 2018, the management of the company announced preparing its business units for an eventual IPO.

In November 2019, the Zorlu Group announced a $400-million investment to boost its production capacities, and the launch of domestic electric cars on the Turkish market by 2022.

== Description ==
Zorlu Group companies are active principally in the areas of textiles, white goods and electronics manufacturing, energy, and financial services.

Zorlu's subsidiary Vestel is responsible for the manufacture of a series of PVRs (codenamed T810, T816, T825 etc.), branded in the UK under such brands as Goodmans, Digihome, Hitachi and Grundig. These devices run firmware developed by the British company Cabot Communications.

== Organization ==
Textiles subsidiaries:

- KORTEKS YARN
- BEL-AIR GARDINEN
- ZORLUTEKS TEXTILE
- KORTEKS AFRICA
- LİNENS MARKETING
- ZORLU USA
- ZORLU FOREIGN TRADE
- ZORLU UK LTD
- ZORLU HOMETEKS ZORLU GMBH
- ZORLU MENSUCAT
- ZORLU MACEDONIA
- BEL-AIR INDUSTRIES

Electronics subsidiaries:

- Vestel

Minerals subsidiaries:

- Meta Nikel Madencilik (50% owned by GSR Capital)

Energy subsidiaries:

- Zorlu Enerji:
  - 42.14% stake in Ashdod and Ramat natural gas facilities in Israel
  - Gas-fired Lüleburgaz Power Plant
- ZES (Zorlu Energy Solutions) EV charging stations infrastructures

Defence subsidiaries

- Vestel Defence

== Governance ==
The Zorlu Group was headed by its two co-chairmen, Ahmet Nazif Zorlu and Zeki Zorlu.
