= Electricity distribution companies by country =

This is a list of Electricity distribution companies by country.

== Albania ==
- KESH (Albanian Power Corporation)
- OSHEE (Electric Power Distribution Operator)
- OST (Transmission System Operator)

== Algeria ==
- SDC (Groupe SONELGAZ)

== Australia ==
- Ausgrid (previously EnergyAustralia)
- AusNet Services (previously SP AusNet)
- Endeavour Energy (previously Integral Energy)
- Energex
- Ergon Energy
- Essential Energy (previously Country Energy)
- Evoenergy (previously ActewAGL)
- Horizon Power
- Jemena
- Powercor Australia (includes CitiPower)
- PowerWater
- SA Power Networks (previously ETSA Utilities)
- TasNetworks
- United Energy
- Western Power

== Azerbaijan ==
- Azerishiq (Baku)
- Azerenerji

== Bangladesh ==
- Ashuganj Power Station Company Limited
- Bangladesh Power Development Board
- Dhaka Electric Supply Company Limited
- Dhaka Power Distribution Company
- Electricity Generation Company of Bangladesh
- Northern Electricity Supply Company Limited
- Power Grid Company of Bangladesh Limited
- Rural Electrification Board of Bangladesh
- West Zone Power Distribution Company Limited

== Barbados ==
- Barbados Light and Power Company

== Belgium ==
- Eandis
  - Eandis:IMEA
  - Eandis:Imewo
  - Eandis:Intergem
  - Eandis:Iveka
  - Eandis:Iverlek
  - Eandis:Sibelgas
- Elia
- Gaselwest
- Infrax
  - Infrax:P.B.E.
  - Infrax:IVEG
  - Infrax:Infrax-West
  - Infrax:Inter-Electra
- ORES
  - Ores:IDEG
  - Ores:IEH
  - Ores:IGH
  - Ores:Interest
  - Ores:Interlux
  - Ores:Intermosane
  - Ores:Sedilec
  - Ores:Simogel
- RESA
- Sibelga

== Brazil ==
- Enel São Paulo
- Energisa
- EDP Brasil
- Celesc
- Celpe
- Cemig
- CPFL, subsidiary of State Grid Corporation of China
- Coelba
- Copel
- Cosern
- Elektro
- Equatorial Energia
- Light
- RGE

== Botswana ==
- Botswana Power Corporation

== Canada ==
- Alectra Utilities
- AltaLink
- ATCO Electric
- ATCO Power
- BC Hydro and Power Authority
- Brookfield Power
- Cornwall Electric
- ENMAX
- EPCOR
- EQUS REA LTD.
- FortisAlberta
- FortisBC
- Hydro One
- Hydro Ottawa
- Hydro-Québec Distribution
- Manicouagan Power Company
- Manitoba Hydro
- Maritime Electric Power Company
- New Brunswick Power
- Newfoundland and Labrador Hydro
- Newfoundland Power
- Northwest Territories Power Corporation
- Nova Scotia Power
- Ontario Power Generation
- Saint John Energy
- SaskPower
- Toronto Hydro
- TransAlta
- TransCanada Corporation
- Yukon Energy Corporation

Additionally, there are dozens of small regional companies, some of which are listed in List of Canadian electric utilities.

== China ==
- China Southern Power Grid
- State Grid Corporation of China

== Colombia ==
- ISA INTERCOLOMBIA (Grupo ISA)

== Costa Rica ==
- Instituto Costarricense de Electricidad
- Compañía Nacional de Fuerza y Luz (CNFL)
- Coopeguanacaste
- Coopelesca
- Coopesantos
- Coopealfaroruiz
- Empresa de Servicios Públicos de Heredia (ESPH)
- JASEC

== Croatia ==
- HEP Operator distribucijskog sustava (HEP ODS)

== Cyprus ==
- Electricity Authority of Cyprus

== Czech Republic ==
- CEZ Distribuce
- E.ON Distribuce
- PREdistribuce

== Denmark ==
- DONG Energy - now Orsted
- Energi & MiljøForum Thy/Mors
- Energi Fyn
- Energi Hurup
- Energi Nord
- EnergiMidt
- Elforsyning Sydvendsyssel
- Helsingør Elforsyning
- Himmerlands Elforsyning
- Korsør Forsyning A/S
- N1
- Natur-Energi
- NRGi
- Nyfors
- SEAS-NVE
- SYD Energi (ESS Energi Danmark)
- Struer Forsyning
- Sydfyns Elforsyning
- TRE-FOR
- Verdo

== Ethiopia ==
- Ethiopian electric utility

== Estonia ==
- 220 Energia
- Alexela Energia
- Baltic Energy Services
- Eesti Energia
- Eesti Gaas
- Elektrum (Latvenergo)
- Elveso
- Energijos tiekimas
- ESRO
- Imatra Elekter (Imatran Seudun Sähkö)
- Sagro Elekter
- Sillamäe SEJ
- TS Energia (Port of Tallinn)
- VKG Elektrivõrgud

== Finland ==
- Caruna
- Elenia
- Forssan Energia
- Helen
- Kokemäen Sähkö
- Köyliön-Säkylän Sähkö
- Lankosken Sähkö
- Lappeenrannan Energia
- Leppäkosken Sähkö
- Lammaisten Energia
- Paneliankosken Voima
- Pohjolan Voima
- Sallila Energia
- Savon Voima
- Tampereen Sähköverkko
- Teollisuuden Voima
- Vantaan Energia
- Vatajankosken Sähkö
- Vakka-Suomen Voima

== France ==
- Enedis, main distribution company in France with 95% of the electricity distribution grid, 100% subsidiary of Électricité de France (EDF)
- Local distribution companies :
  - Electricité de Strasbourg (ES Energies)
  - Gaz Electricité de Grenoble (GEG)
  - Sorégies
  - SICAE de l’Aisne
  - Régie d’électricité de Roquebillière
  - Régie municipale de Tarascon-sur-Ariège
  - Régie du Syndicat Electrique Intercommunal du Pays Chartrain (RSEIPC)
  - Régie municipale multiservices de la Réole
  - SICAP Pithiviers
  - Régie communale d’électricité de Saulnes
  - Usine d’Électricité de Metz (UEM)
  - SICAE de l’Oise
  - Vialis Colmar
  - Régie d’électricité d’Elbeuf
  - Seolis
  - Coopérative d’électricité de Villiers-sur-Marne

== Germany ==
- E.ON
- EnBW
- Entega
- EWR
- RWE
- Stadtwerke Gronau
- Stadtwerke Haiger
- Stadtwerke Mainz
- M-Strom (Stadtwerke München)
- Vattenfall
- Westnetz
- Stromnetz Berlin
- Westnetz GmbH
- Bayernwerk Netz GmbH
- Netze BW GmbH
- Stromnetz Berlin GmbH
- Mitteldeutsche Netzgesellschaft Strom mbH
- EWE NETZ GmbH
- E.DIS Netz GmbH
- Avacon Netz GmbH
- Syna GmbH
- Stromnetz Hamburg GmbH
- Rheinische NETZGesellschaft mbH
- SWM Infrastruktur GmbH & Co. KG
- EAM Netz GmbH
- Schleswig-Holstein Netz AG
- n-ERGIE Netz GmbH
- Westfalen Weser Netz GmbH
- LEW Verteilnetz GmbH
- TEN Thüringer Energienetze GmbH & Co. KG
- NEW Netz GmbH
- e-netz Südhessen GmbH & Co. KG
- NRM Netzdienste Rhein-Main GmbH
- enercity Netzgesellschaft mbH
- ENSO Netz GmbH
- Netzgesellschaft Düsseldorf mbH
- Stuttgart Netze Betrieb GmbH
- Netz Leipzig GmbH
- Dortmunder Netz GmbH
- regionetz GmbH
- wesernetz Bremen GmbH
- Pfalzwerke Netz AG
- DREWAG NETZ GmbH
- Netze Duisburg GmbH
- ED Netze GmbH
- ELE Verteilnetz GmbH
- ENERVIE Vernetzt GmbH
- ovag Netz AG
- Netzgesellschaft Ostwürttemberg DonauRies GmbH
- EWR Netz GmbH
- e-rp GmbH
- Energienetze Mittelrhein GmbH & Co. KG
- Mainzer Netze GmbH
- Stadtwerke Bochum Netz GmbH
- WSW Netz GmbH
- bnNETZE GmbH
- energis-Netzgesellschaft mbH
- SWB Netz GmbH
- LSW Netz GmbH & Co. KG
- Bonn-Netz GmbH
- MVV Netze GmbH
- münsterNetz GmbH
- Stadtwerke Karlsruhe Netzservice GmbH
- SWKiel Netz GmbH
- swa Netze GmbH
- Stadtwerke Wiesbaden Netz GmbH
- WEMAG Netz GmbH
- Netze Mittelbaden GmbH & Co. KG
- OsthessenNetz GmbH
- NGN NETZGESELLSCHAFT NIEDERRHEIN MBH
- Braunschweiger Netz GmbH
- Regensburg Netz GmbH
- Netze Magdeburg GmbH
- Celle-Uelzen Netz GmbH
- Energieversorgung Halle Netz GmbH
- Stadtwerke Ulm/Neu-Ulm Netze GmbH
- Energienetze Offenbach GmbH
- Netz Lübeck GmbH
- Oberhausener Netzgesellschaft mbH
- SWE Netz GmbH
- FairNetz GmbH
- Stadtwerke Rostock Netzgesellschaft mbH
- Mainfranken Netze GmbH
- AVU Netz GmbH
- Städtische Werke Netz + Service GmbH
- AllgäuNetz GmbH & Co. KG
- Netzgesellschaft Potsdam GmbH
- Stadtwerke Saarbrücken Netz AG
- Energie- und Wasserversorgung Hamm GmbH
- TWL Netze GmbH
- Mittelhessen Netz GmbH
- Harz Energie Netz GmbH
- SWO Netz GmbH
- SWS Netze Solingen GmbH
- Stadtwerke Heidelberg Netze GmbH
- Stadtwerke Jena Netze GmbH
- SWP Stadtwerke Pforzheim GmbH & Co. KG
- Stadtwerke Ingolstadt Netze GmbH
- NHF Netzgesellschaft Heilbronn-Franken mbH
- GGEW, Gruppen-Gas- und Elektrizitätswerk Bergstraße AG
- infra fürth gmbh
- Energie Waldeck-Frankenberg GmbH
- Unterfränkische Überlandzentrale eG
- Erlanger Stadtwerke AG
- wesernetz Bremerhaven GmbH
- EWR GmbH
- Albwerk GmbH & Co. KG
- GSW Gemeinschaftsstadtwerke GmbH
- SWT Stadtwerke Trier Versorgungs-GmbH
- EVI Energieversorgung Hildesheim GmbH & Co. KG
- Netzgesellschaft Gütersloh mbH
- Aschaffenburger Versorgungs-GmbH
- SWK Stadtwerke Kaiserslautern Versorgungs-AG
- Netzgesellschaft Schwerin mbH (NGS)
- Hanau Netz GmbH
- GeraNetz GmbH
- SÜC Energie und H2O GmbH
- Überlandwerk Rhön GmbH
- LEITUNGSPARTNER GmbH
- Stadtwerke Konstanz GmbH
- BIGGE ENERGIE GmbH & Co. KG
- Thüga Energienetze GmbH
- Elektroenergieversorgung Cottbus GmbH
- nvb Nordhorner Versorgungsbetriebe GmbH
- Dessauer Stromversorgung GmbH
- Zwickauer Energieversorgung GmbH
- GEW Wilhelmshaven GmbH
- Vereinigte Wertach-Elektrizitätswerke GmbH
- Stadtwerke Troisdorf GmbH
- KEW Kommunale Energie- und Wasserversorgung AG
- TWS Netz GmbH
- Energie- und Wasserversorgung Rheine GmbH
- Bocholter Energie- und Wasserversorgung GmbH
- BEW Netze GmbH
- StWB Stadtwerke Brandenburg an der Havel GmbH & Co. KG
- Stadtwerke Aalen GmbH
- Stadtwerke Schweinfurt GmbH
- Energieversorgung Rüsselsheim GmbH
- Verteilnetz Plauen GmbH
- ENWG Energienetze Weimar GmbH & Co. KG
- Neubrandenburger Stadtwerke GmbH
- Osterholzer Stadtwerke GmbH & Co. KG
- Stadtwerke Rosenheim Netze GmbH
- Hertener Stadtwerke GmbH
- Überlandwerk Leinetal GmbH
- SWS Netze GmbH
- Netzgesellschaft Frankfurt (Oder) mbH
- Regionalwerk Bodensee Netze GmbH & Co. KG
- Vereinigte Stadtwerke Netz GmbH
- Mainnetz GmbH
- GWS Stadtwerke Hameln GmbH
- Stadtwerke Wolfenbüttel GmbH
- EnergieSüdwest Netz GmbH
- Albstadtwerke GmbH
- Netzgesellschaft Ahlen mbH
- Hellenstein-Energie-Logistik GmbH
- KommEnergie GmbH
- enwag energie- und wassergesellschaft mbH
- SVS-Versorgungsbetriebe GmbH
- Stadtwerke Passau GmbH
- Freisinger Stadtwerke Versorgungs-GmbH
- Überlandwerk Erding GmbH & Co. KG
- Elektrizitätswerk Wörth a.d. Donau Rupert Heider & Co. KG
- SWE Netz GmbH (Ettlingen)
- star.Energiewerke GmbH & Co. KG
- Energie- und Wasserversorgung Bruchsal GmbH
- SWF Stadtwerke Fellbach GmbH
- Stromnetz Weiden i.d.Opf. GmbH & Co. KG
- Stadtnetze Neustadt a. Rbge. GmbH & Co. KG
- MEGA Monheimer Elektrizitäts- und Gasversorgung GmbH
- ENRW Energieversorgung Rottweil GmbH & Co. KG
- Strom- und Gasnetz Wismar GmbH
- EVB Netze GmbH
- Nordhausen Netz GmbH
- Alliander Netz Heinsberg GmbH
- Freiberger Stromversorgung GmbH
- Maintal-Werke-GmbH
- Energienetze Bayern GmbH
- FREITALER STROM+GAS GMBH
- Netzgesellschaft Bitterfeld-Wolfen mbH
- Teutoburger Energie Netzwerk eG (TEN eG)
- EGT Energie GmbH
- SWL Verteilungsnetzgesellschaft mbH
- WEV Warendorfer Energieversorgung GmbH
- Stadtwerke Merseburg GmbH
- Energie- und Wasserwerke Bautzen GmbH
- Stadtwerke Zweibrücken GmbH
- Netzwerke Saarlouis GmbH
- Elektrizitätsnetze Allgäu GmbH
- Versorgungsbetriebe Hoyerswerda GmbH
- e.wa riss Netze GmbH
- Rheinhessische Energie- und Wasserversorgungs-GmbH
- Sömmerdaer Energieversorgung GmbH
- Werraenergie GmbH
- SEW Stromversorgungs-GmbH
- NHL Netzgesellschaft Heilbronner Land GmbH & Co. KG
- KWH Netz GmbH
- Stromnetzgesellschaft Herrenberg mbH & Co. KG
- Netzwerke Merzig GmbH
- Stadt- und Überlandwerke GmbH Luckau-Lübbenau
- Energie- und Wasserversorgung Altenburg GmbH
- REDINET Burgenland GmbH
- SWN Stadtwerke Northeim GmbH
- Stadtwerke Ilmenau GmbH
- Meißener Stadtwerke GmbH
- Wirtschaftsbetriebe der Stadt Norden GmbH
- Bad Honnef AG
- Technische Werke Naumburg GmbH
- Stadtwerke Zirndorf GmbH
- Netzgesellschaft Lübbecke mbH
- VersorgungsBetriebe Elbe GmbH
- Stromnetz Kulmbach GmbH & Co. KG
- SSW Netz GmbH
- Kommunale Energienetze Inn-Salzach GmbH & Co. KG
- Kommunale Energieversorgung GmbH Eisenhüttenstadt
- Saalfelder Energienetze GmbH
- Schleswiger Stadtwerke GmbH
- Stadtwerke Staßfurt GmbH
- EGF EnergieGesellschaft Frankenberg mbH
- Herzo Werke GmbH
- Versorgungsbetriebe Hann. Münden GmbH
- Stadtwerke Lutherstadt Eisleben GmbH
- EZV Energie- und Service GmbH & Co. KG Untermain
- Energie Calw GmbH
- Licht-, Kraft- und Wasserwerke Kitzingen GmbH
- ENA Energienetze Apolda GmbH
- EnR Energienetze Rudolstadt GmbH
- Stadtwerk Tauberfranken GmbH
- T.W.O. Technische Werke Osning GmbH
- Stadtwerke Zittau GmbH
- Greizer Energienetze GmbH
- Städtische Betriebswerke Luckenwalde GmbH
- InfraServ GmbH & Co. Wiesbaden KG
- TRIDELTA Energieversorgungs GmbH
- Stromversorgung Neunkirchen GmbH
- Stromnetzgesellschaft Hechingen GmbH & Co. KG
- Energieversorgung Sylt GmbH
- EVE Netz GmbH
- EHINGER ENERGIE GmbH & Co. KG
- SWL-energis Netzgesellschaft mbH & Co. KG
- Stadtwerke Wolfhagen GmbH
- Energieversorgung Alzenau GmbH
- NETZE Bad Langensalza GmbH
- Netzgesellschaft Forst (Lausitz) mbH & Co. KG
- SWV Regional GmbH
- SWW Wunsiedel GmbH
- SVI - Stromversorgung Ismaning GmbH
- ews-Netz GmbH
- Überlandzentrale Wörth/I.-Altheim Netz AG
- Stadtwerke Weißenburg GmbH
- Stadtwerk Haßfurt GmbH
- Stadtwerke Witzenhausen GmbH
- Verteilnetze Energie Weißenhorn GmbH & Co. KG
- Stadtwerke Zeven GmbH
- TWL-Verteilnetz GmbH
- NWW Netzwerke Wadern GmbH
- Städtische Werke Borna Netz GmbH
- SWN Stadtwerke Neustadt GmbH
- NordNetz GmbH
- Blomberger Versorgungsbetriebe GmbH
- StWL Städtische Werke Lauf a.d. Pegnitz GmbH
- Stromversorgung Zerbst GmbH & Co. KG
- eneREGIO GmbH
- SWR Energie GmbH & Co. KG
- Stromversorgung Pfaffenhofen a. d. Ilm GmbH & Co. KG
- NWS Netzwerke Saarwellingen GmbH
- Energie und Wasserversorgung Aktiengesellschaft Kamenz
- EMB Energieversorgung Miltenberg-Bürgstadt GmbH & Co. KG
- Butzbacher Netzbetrieb GmbH & Co. KG
- HEWA GmbH
- Kommunalunternehmen Gemeindewerke Peißenberg
- PVU Energienetze GmbH
- Versorgungsbetriebe Kronshagen GmbH
- Bauer Netz GmbH & Co. KG
- VersorgungsWerke Heddesheim GmbH & Co. KG
- Elektrizitätsgenossenschaft Hasbergen e.G.
- Verbandsgemeindewerke Dahner Felsenland
- Eichsfelder Energie- und Wasserversorgungsgesellschaft mbH
- Netzgesellschaft Eisenberg mbH
- Stadtnetze Barmstedt GmbH
- KEEP - Kommunale Eisenberger Energiepartner GmbH
- Regionalnetze Linzgau GmbH
- SVH Stromversorgung Haar GmbH
- Netzbetrieb Hirschberg GmbH & Co. KG
- Odenwald Netzgesellschaft GmbH & Co. KG
- Energie- und Wasserversorgung Kirchzarten GmbH
- Versorgungsbetriebe Bordesholm GmbH
- Havelstrom Zehdenick GmbH
- Weißachtal-Kraftwerke eG
- Stromversorgung Angermünde GmbH
- SWB Stadtwerke Biedenkopf GmbH
- Feuchter Gemeindewerke GmbH
- Stadtwerke Zwiesel
- Stromversorgung Sulz GmbH
- Städtisches Kommunalunternehmen Baiersdorf
- Überlandwerk Eppler GmbH
- GELSENWASSER Energienetze GmbH
- KEW Karwendel Energie & Wasser GmbH
- Saerbecker Ver- und Entsorgungsnetzgesellschaft mbH
- Verbandsgemeindewerke Enkenbach-Alsenborn
- Energieversorgung A9 Mitte GmbH & Co. KG
- Licht- und Kraftwerke Helmbrechts GmbH
- EWR Netze GmbH
- Versorgungsbetriebe Zellingen
- Kommunalunternehmen Stadtwerke Klingenberg (AöR)
- Stadtwerke Zeil a. Main
- Elektrizitätswerke Schönau Netze GmbH
- Stromversorgung Inzell eG
- Stromversorgung Schierling eG
- Wirtschaftsbetriebe der Stadt NSHB Borkum GmbH
- abita Energie Otterberg GmbH
- Stromversorgung Röttenbach
- Versorgungsbetrieb Waldbüttelbrunn GmbH
- Gammertinger Energie- und Wasserversorgung GmbH
- Cramer-Mühle KG
- Gebrüder Eirich GmbH & Co KG
- Gebrüder Miller GmbH & Co. KG
- EVI Energieversorgung Ihmert GmbH & Co KG
- Raiffeisenbank Greding-Thalmässing eG
- C. Ensinger GmbH & Co. KG
- Westenthanner Energieversorgung GmbH
- Rothmoser GmbH & Co. KG
- Elektrizitätsgenossenschaft Dirmstein eG
- Elektrizitätsgenossenschaft Oesterweg e.G.
- Elektra-Genossenschaft Effeltrich eG
- TauberEnergie Kuhn, Karl und Andreas Kuhn OHG
- Energienetze Berlin GmbH
- Versorgungsbetriebe Röttingen
- GETEC net delta GmbH & Co.KG
- Fürstlich Fugger v. Glött´sche E-Werk GmbH & Co. KG
- Eichenmüller GmbH & Co. KG Energieversorgung + Elektrotechnik
- Markt Thüngen
- Müller - Mühle GmbH & Co. KG
- Hermann Geuder e.K. Elektrizitätswerk
- Stromkontor Netzgesellschaft mbH
- Elektrizitätsgenossenschaft Karlstein eG
- Elektrizitäts- und Wasserversorgungsgenossenschaft Vagen eG
- EVIP GmbH
- Covestro Brunsbüttel Energie GmbH
- Pharmaserv GmbH

== Greece ==
- HEDNO

== Hong Kong ==
- CLP
- Hongkong Electric

== Hungary ==
- ÉDÁSZ
- DÉDÁSZ
- TITÁSZ
- ELMŰ
- ÉMÁSZ
- DÉMÁSZ

== Iceland ==
- HS Veitur
- Landsnet (Transmission System Operator)
- Norðurorka
- Orkubú Vestfjarða
- RARIK
- Veitur

== India ==
- Adani Electricity Mumbai Limited
- Ajmer Vidyut Vitran Nigam Ltd
- Andhra Pradesh State Electricity Board (APSEB), Andhra Pradesh
- Southern Power Distribution Company of Andhra Pradesh Limited
- Assam Power Distribution Company Limited (APDCL), Assam
- Bangalore Electricity Supply Company
- Brihanmumbai Electric Supply and Transport
- BSES Rajdhani Power Ltd. Delhi
- BSES Yamuna Power Ltd. Delhi
- Calcutta Electric Supply Corporation
- Chamundeshwari Electricity Supply Corporation Limited
- Dakshin Gujarat Vij Company Ltd. (DGVCL) Surat
- Dakshin Haryana Bijli Vitran Nigam
- Damodar Valley Corporation
- Essel Vidhyut Vitran Ujjain Pvt. Ltd.
- Goa Electricity Board
- Gulbarga Electricity Supply Company Limited
- Hubli Electricity Supply Company Limited
- India Power Corporation Limited
- Jaipur Vidyut Vitran Nigam Limited
- Jodhpur Vidyut Vitran Nigam Ltd
- Karnataka Power Corporation Limited
- Kerala State Electricity Board
- Madhya Pradesh Paschim Kshetra Vidyut Vitaran Company Ltd.
- Madhya Pradesh Poorv Kshetra Vidyut Vitaran Company Ltd.
- Madhya Pradesh Madhya Kshetra Vidyut Vitaran Company Ltd.
- Madhya Gujarat Vij Company Ltd. (MGVCL) Vadodara
- Maharashtra State Electricity Distribution Company Limited
- Mangalore Electricity Supply Company Limited
- Manipur State Power Distribution Company Limited
- National Thermal Power Corporation
- Neyveli Lignite Corporation
- North Eastern Supply Company of Odisha Ltd
- Noida Power Company Limited
- North Bihar Power Distribution Company Limited
- Paschim Gujarat Vij Company Ltd (PGVCL) Rajkot
- Power Development Department
- PowerGrid Corporation of India
- Punjab State Power Corporation Limited
- Reliance Infrastructure
- South Bihar Power Distribution Company Limited
- Southern Electricity Supply Company of Orissa
- Tamil Nadu Electricity Board
- Tata Power
- Tata Power Delhi Distribution Limited (NDPL), Delhi
- Northern Power Distribution Company of Telangana Limited (TGNPDCL)
- Southern Power Distribution Company of Telangana Limited (TGSPDCL)
- Torrent Power Ltd
- Torrent Power Ltd, Agra
- Torrent Power Ltd, Ahmedabad
- Torrent Power Ltd, Surat
- Tripura State Electricity Corporation Limited (TSECL)
- Uttar Gujarat Vij Company Ltd (UGVCL) Mehsana
- Uttar Haryana Bijli Vitran Nigam Limited
- Uttar Pradesh Power Corporation Limited
  - Dakshinanchal Vidyut Vitaran Nigam Limited (DVVNL)[2] - Agra Zone Discom
  - Kanpur Electricity Supply Company (KESCO)[6] - Kanpur City Discom
  - Lucknow Electricity Supply Administration (LESA) - Lucknow City Discom
  - Madhyanchal Vidyut Vitaran Nigam Limited (MVVNL)[3] - Lucknow Zone Discom
  - Pashchimanchal Vidyut Vitaran Nigam Limited (PVVNL)[4] - Meerut Zone Discom
  - Purvanchal Vidyut Vitaran Nigam Limited (PUVVNL)[5] - Varanasi Zone Discom
- West Bengal State Electricity Distribution Company Limited (WBSEDCL)

== Indonesia ==
- Perusahaan Listrik Negara

== Ireland ==
- ESB Group

== Italy ==
- A2A
- Edison S.p.A.
- Enel
- Eni
- Sorgenia
- Terna Group

== Iran ==
- TAVANIR

== Israel ==
- Israel Electric Corporation

== Japan ==
- Chubu Electric Power Company
- Chugoku Electric Power Company
- Hokkaido Electric Power Company
- Hokuriku Electric Power Company
- Kansai Electric Power Company
- Kyushu Electric Power Company
- Okinawa Electric Power Company
- Shikoku Electric Power Company
- Tohoku Electric Power Company
- Tokyo Electric Power Company

== Jordan ==
- NEPCO
- Jordan Electric Power Company - JEPCO

== Kenya ==
- Kenya Power and Lighting Company

== Latvia ==
- Inter RAO
- Latvenergo

== Lebanon ==
- Electricité Du Liban (EDL)

== Lithuania ==
- AB ESO

== Macau ==
- CEM

== Madagascar ==
- Jirama
- Hydelec Madagascar

== Malaysia ==
- Tenaga Nasional
- Sarawak Energy
- Sabah Electricity

== Mexico ==
- Comisión Federal de Electricidad

== Namibia ==
- Central North Regional Electricity Distributor
- City of Windhoek
- Erongo Red
- NamPower
- Nored Electricity

== Nepal ==
- Nepal Electricity Authority

== Netherlands ==
- Coteq Netbeheer
- Enduris
- Enexis
- Liander
- Rendo
- Stedin
- Westland Infra

== New Zealand ==
- Alpine Energy
- Aurora Energy
- Buller Electricity
- Centralines
- Counties Power
- Electra
- Electricity Ashburton
- Electricity Invercargill
- Firstlight Network
- Horizon Energy Distribution
- MainPower
- Marlborough Lines
- Nelson Electricity
- Network Tasman
- Network Waitaki
- Northpower
- Orion
- OtagoNet
- Powerco
- Scanpower
- The Lines Company
- The Power Company
- Top Energy
- Unison Networks
- Vector Limited
- Waipā Networks
- WEL Networks
- Wellington Electricity
- Westpower

== Nigeria ==
- Abuja Electricity Distribution Company
- Benin Electricity Distribution Company
- Eko Electricity Distribution Company
- Enugu Electricity Distribution Company
- Ibadan Electricity Distribution Company
- Ikeja Electricity Distribution Company
- Jos Electricity Distribution Company
- Kaduna Electricity Distribution Company Plc
- Kano Electricity Distribution Company
- Port Harcourt Electricity Distribution Company
- Yola Electricity Distribution Company

== North Macedonia ==
- EVN AD Skopje (subsidiary of EVN Group)

== Pakistan ==
- Faisalabad Electric Supply Company
- Gujranwala Electric Power Company
- Hazara Electric Power Company
- Hyderabad Electric Supply Company
- Islamabad Electric Supply Company
- K-Electric
- Lahore Electric Supply Company
- Multan Electric Power Company
- Peshawar Electric Power Company
- Quetta Electric Supply Company
- Sukkur Electric Supply Company
- Tribal Electric Supply Company

== Philippines ==
- Davao Light and Power Company
- Meralco
- National Power Corporation
- National Grid Corporation of the Philippines
- Visayan Electric Company

== Poland ==
- Enea Operator Sp. z o.o.
- Energa Operator SA
- PGE Dystrybucja SA
- Polskie Sieci Elektroenergetyczne (PSE)
- RWE Stoen Operator Sp. z o.o.
- Tauron Dystrybucja SA

== Portugal ==
- Energias de Portugal
- Redes Energéticas Nacionais

== Qatar ==
- Kahramaa

== Romania ==
- Delgaz Grid (E.ON Romania)
- Distribuție Energie Electrică România (Electrica)
- Distribuție Energie Oltenia (Macquarie Infrastructure and Real Assets)
- Rețele Electrice România (PPC Romania)

== Russia ==
- Rosseti
- RusHydro
- Inter RAO
- IDGC of the Urals
- IDGC of Siberia
- IDGC of Center and Volga Region
- IDGC of Volga
- IDGC of South
- IDGC of the North Caucasus
- Kubanenergo
- Lenenergo
- Moscow United Electric Grid Company
- Tyumenenergo
- Yantarenergo

== Serbia ==
- Elektrodistribucija Srbije
- ENEKOD
- Restart Energy DOO

== Singapore ==
- Singapore Power

== Slovenia ==
- Elektro Celje
- Elektro Gorenjska
- Elektro Ljubljana
- Elektro Maribor
- Elektro Primorska
- GEN-I

== South Africa ==
- Eskom

== South Korea ==
- Korea Electric Power Corporation

== Spain ==
- Endesa
- Iberdrola
- Naturgy
- Red Eléctrica de España

== Sri Lanka ==
- Ceylon Electricity Board
- Lanka Electricity Company

== Sweden ==
- E.ON
- Ellevio
- Götene Elförening ek. för.
- Gislaved Energi AB
- Öresundskraft
- Sala-Heby Energi Elnät AB
- Smedjebacken Energi Nät AB
- Sollentuna Energi AB
- Varabygdens Energi ek. för.
- Vattenfall

== Switzerland ==
- BKW
- Groupe E

== Taiwan ==
- Taiwan Power Company

== Tanzania ==
- TANESCO-TZ does not allow any other firm to provide electricity

== Thailand ==
- Electricity Generating Authority of Thailand
- Metropolitan Electricity Authority
- Provincial Electricity Authority

== Turkey ==
- Akdeniz Electricity Distribution Company
- Akedaş Electricity Distribution Corp.
- Aras Electricity Distribution Company
- Aydem Electricity Distribution Corp.
- Boğaziçi Electricity Distribution Company
- Çalık Yeşilırmak Electricity Distribution Company
- Çamlıbel Electricity Distribution Corp.
- Çoruh Electricity Distribution Company
- Dicle Electricity Distribution Company
- Enerjisa Başkent Electricity Distribution Company
- Fırat Electricity Distribution Company
- Gediz Electricity Distribution Company
- İstanbul Anadolu Yakası Electricity Distribution Company
- Kayseri ve Civarı Electricity Distribution Turk Corp.
- Meram Electricity Distribution Company
- Osmangazi Electricity Distribution Company
- Sakarya Electricity Distribution Company
- Trakya Electricity Distribution Company
- Toroslar Electricity Distribution Company
- Turkish Electricity Distribution Corporation
- Uludağ Electricity Distribution Company
- Yeşilırmak Electricity Distribution Company
- Van Gölü Electricity Distribution Company

== United Arab Emirates ==
- Abu Dhabi - Abu Dhabi Distribution Company (ADDC) and Al Ain Distribution Company (AADC)
- Dubai - Dubai Electricity & Water Authority (DEWA)
- Sharjah - Sharjah Electricity & Water Authority (SEWA)
- Rest of UAE - Federal Electricity & Water Authority (FEWA)

== United Kingdom ==
There are 15 distribution network operator (DNO) regions. Fourteen different district networks are managed by six operators across England, Scotland and Wales, whilst one operator controls the distribution network in Northern Ireland.

England

- Electricity North West (previously NORWEB)
- Northern Powergrid (Northern Electric & Yorkshire Electricity)
- Scottish and Southern Electricity Networks (previously Scottish Hydro-Electric)
- Scottish Power (SP Manweb)
- UK Power Networks (LPN-EPN & SPN)
- National Grid (Great Britain) (Western Power Distribution, Central Networks and SWEB)

Scotland

- Scottish and Southern Electricity Networks (previously Scottish Hydro-Electric)
- Scottish Power

Wales

- Scottish Power (SP Manweb)
- National Grid (Great Britain) (Western Power Distribution, Infralec and South Wales Electricity)

Northern Ireland

- ESB Group (Northern Ireland Electricity)

== United States ==
- Alabama - Alabama Power, a part of the Southern Company, PowerSouth Energy Cooperative, Wiregrass Electric Cooperative, Tennessee Valley Authority
- Alaska - Golden Valley Electric Association, Chugach Electric Association, Copper Valley Electric Association, Municipal Light & Power, Kodiak Electric Association
- Arizona - Arizona Public Service, Salt River Project, Tucson Electric Power
- Arkansas - Entergy
- California - Azusa Light & Water, East Bay Municipal Utility District, Glendale Public Service Department, Gridley Municipal Utilities, Healdsburg Municipal Electric Department, Los Angeles Department of Water and Power, Merced Irrigation District, Modesto Irrigiation District, Nevada Irrigation District, Placer County Water Agency, Pacific Gas & Electric, Pacific Power, Riverside Public Utilities, Sacramento Municipal Utility District, Santa Clara Electric Department, San Diego Gas & Electric, Sierra-Pacific Power, Southern California Edison, Southern California Public Power Authority, Turlock Irrigation District, California Department of Water Resources, U.S. Bureau of Reclamation, Pasadena Water & Power, Burbank Water & Power, Anaheim Public Utilities
- Colorado - Xcel Energy
- Connecticut - Northeast Utilities (including Connecticut Light & Power), United Illuminating, Connecticut Natural Gas, Discount Power
- Delaware - Delmarva Power and Light (a subsidiary of Exelon)
- District of Columbia - PEPCO
- Florida - Florida Power & Light, TECO, Progress Energy Florida, Lake Worth Utilities, JEA (formerly Jacksonville Electric Authority), Gulf Power Company, a part of the Southern Company, Kissimmee Utility Authority, Ocala Electric, Florida Public Utility Company Palm Beach, Florida Municipal Power Agency, LCEC
- Georgia - Georgia Power, a part of the Southern Company, Flint Energies, Tennessee Valley Authority
- Hawaii - Hawaiian Electric Industries (HECO)
- Idaho - IDACORP, PacifiCorp (Rocky Mountain Power)
- Illinois - ComEd, Ameren
- Indiana - AES Indiana, Duke Energy, Northern Indiana Public Service Company, American Electric Power
- Iowa - MidAmerican Energy
- Kansas - Kansas City Power & Light, Westar Energy, Kansas City Board of Public Utilities
- Kentucky - Kentucky Utilities, Louisville Gas & Electric, Duke Energy, American Electric PowerOwensboro Municipal Utilities
- Louisiana - SWEPCO (a subsidiary of American Electric Power), Entergy, CLECO
- Maine - Central Maine Power, Bangor Hydro Electric
- Maryland - Allegheny Power, Baltimore Gas & Electric, Choptank Electric Cooperative, Delmarva Power, PEPCO, Southern Maryland Electric Cooperative,
- Massachusetts - Massachusetts Municipal Wholesale Electric Company (MMWEC), NSTAR, Northeast Utilities (including Western Massachusetts Electric, Berkshire Company/WMECO), National Grid (including Nantucket Electric and Massachusetts Electric), Peabody Municipal Light Plant
- Michigan - Consumers Energy, DTE Energy/(Detroit Edison), We Energies, American Electric Power, Wyandotte Municipal Services City of Wyandotte only, Holland Board of Public Works, Lansing Board of Water & Light
- Mississippi - Entergy, Southwest Mississippi Electric Power Association, Magnolia Electric, Mississippi Power company, a part of the Southern Company, Tennessee Valley Authority
- Minnesota - Xcel Energy, Great River Energy (and its 28-member cooperatives), Minnkota Power Cooperative (and its 11-member cooperatives), Basin Electric Power Cooperative, Dairyland Power Co-op, East River Electric Power Co-op, Hutchinson Utilities Commission, Interstate Power and Light Company, L&O Power Co-op, Marshall Municipal Utilities, Minnesota Power, Minnetonka Power Co-op, Missouri River Energy, Otter Tail Power Company, Rochester Public Utilities Commission, Southern Minnesota Municipal Power Agency, Willmar Municipal Utilities, Freeborn-Mower Co-op Services, People’s Co-op, Tri-County Electric
- Missouri - Ameren, Kansas City Power & Light, Empire District Electric, Aquila, City Utilities of Springfield, Independence Power and Light
- Montana - Central Montana Electric Power Cooperative, MDU, Montana Electric Cooperatives' Association (and its 25-member cooperatives), NorthWestern Energy
- Nebraska - Omaha Public Power District, Nebraska Public Power District
- Nevada - Nevada Power, Sierra Pacific Power
- New Hampshire - Northeast Utilities (including Public Service of NH), National Grid (including Granite State Electric)
- New Jersey - Atlantic City Electric (A subsidiary of Exelon), Public Service Electric and Gas Company (PSE&G), Northeast Utilities, FirstEnergy, Jersey Central Power and Light Company (A subsidiary of GPU Energy, which is a subsidiary of GPU; all of which is now part of FirstEnergy), Vineland Municipal Electric Utility(the only municipal-owned utility in New Jersey), Sussex Rural Electric Cooperative (the only Electric Utility Cooperative in New Jersey)
- New Mexico - Public Service Company of New Mexico
- New York - CH Energy Group (formerly Central Hudson Gas & Electric), Consolidated Edison Company of New York (Con Edison), Long Island Power Authority (LIPA), Northeast Utilities, National Grid (including Niagara Mohawk), New York State Electric & Gas (NYSEG), Rochester Gas & Electric
- North Carolina - Progress Energy Carolinas, Duke Energy, ElectriCities, North Carolina Electric Membership Corp.
- North Dakota - Xcel Energy, Otter Tail Power Company, MDU, Central Power Electric Cooperative, Minnkota Power Cooperative, Basin Electric Power Cooperative, Upper Missouri G&T Cooperative
- Ohio - Duke Energy, FirstEnergy (Cleveland Electric Illuminating Company, Ohio Edison, Toledo Edison), AEP Ohio, Dayton Power & Light, South Central Power Company, Consolidated Electric Cooperative
- Oklahoma - Oklahoma Gas & Electric, Public Service Company of Oklahoma (part of American Electric Power)
- Oregon - Columbia River Public Utility District, Eugene Water & Electric Board, PacifiCorp (Pacific Power), Portland General Electric, West Oregon Electric Cooperative
- Pennsylvania - Northeast Utilities, Rural valley electric Co. FirstEnergy (Penn Power, Met-Ed, Penelec), PECO, Allegheny Power, PPL, Duquesne Light, Citizens Electric of Lewisburg, Pike County Light & Power Company, UGI Utilities, Inc. and Wellsboro Electric Company
- Puerto Rico - Autoridad de Energía Eléctrica, EcoEléctrica
- Rhode Island - Northeast Utilities, National Grid (including Narragansett Electric)
- South Carolina - Santee Cooper, Duke Energy, Central Electric Power Cooperative, Inc., Progress Energy Carolinas, South Carolina Electric & Gas Company
- South Dakota - Xcel Energy, Otter Tail Power Company, Northwestern Energy, Black Hills Power, East River Electric Cooperative, Rushmore Electric Cooperative
- Tennessee - Citizens Utilities Board, Electric Power Board, Knoxville Utilities Board, Kingsport Power (Appalachian Power), Lenoir City Utilities Board, Memphis Light, Gas and Water, Nashville Electric Service, Tennessee Valley Authority
- Texas - AEP Texas, Austin Energy, CPS Energy, dPi Energy, Electric Database Publishing, Entergy, Garland Power and Light, Lower Colorado River Authority, Reliant Energy, CenterPoint Energy, Texas Electric Service Company, TXU Energy,
- Utah - Intermountain Power Agency, PacifiCorp (Rocky Mountain Power)
- Vermont - Central Vermont Public Service, Green Mountain Power
- Virginia - Allegheny Power, Appalachian Power, Dominion Energy, Rappahannock Electric Cooperative
- Washington - PacifiCorp (Pacific Power), Puget Sound Energy, Seattle City Light, Snohomish County Public Utility District (PUD), Mason County Public Utility District 3, Klickitat Public Utility District, Cowlitz County PUD, Clark County PUD, Asotin County PUD, Benton County PUD, Chelan County PUD, Clallam County PUD, Douglas County PUD, Ferry County PUD, Franklin County PUD, Grant County PUD, Grays Harbor County PUD, Jefferson County PUD, Kitsap County PUD, Kittitas County PUD, Lewis County PUD, Okanogan County PUD, Pacific County PUD, Pend Oreille County PUD, Skagit County PUD, Skamania County PUD, Stevens County PUD, Thurston County PUD, Wahkiakum County PUD, Whatcom County PUD
- West Virginia - Allegheny Power, Appalachian Power, Wheeling Electric Power (AEP Ohio)
- Wisconsin - We Energies, Wisconsin Public Service Corp., Xcel Energy, Madison Gas and Electric, Wisconsin Power & Light
- Wyoming - PacifiCorp (Rocky Mountain Power), Lower Valley Energy

== Uruguay ==
- UTE

== Venezuela ==
- Corpoelec

== Vietnam ==
- Vietnam Electricity (EVN)
