= Kola Adesina =

Nigerian entrepreneur

- Born: 12 August 1964 (age 62)
- Education: University of Lagos; Harvard Business School; The Wharton School
- Occupations: Entrepreneur; energy consultant
- Years active: 1990–present

Kola Adesina (born 1964) is a Nigerian entrepreneur, he serves as the managing director of Sahara Group, and board chairman of Ikeja Electric. a former chairman of Egbin Power Plc.

== Education ==
Adesina earned a B.sc degree in Insurance and M.Sc degree in Business from the University of Lagos. He furthered his education by obtaining executive programmes at Harvard Business School and The Wharton School Advanced Management Program.

== Career ==
Before Sahara Group, Adesina started his career working in the insurance industry. He later joined Sahara Group where he moved up the ladder due to his selling skills. At Sahara Group, he led various projects which included the nationwide strategic management of the supply chain of fuel to the emergency power plant of the defunct National Electricity Power Authority (now Power Holding Company Nigeria Limited), the Majestic Oil delegation on the acquisition of the Sierra Leone Refinery and also managed the crude oil contract of the group in Côte d'Ivoire where he also served as the director of infrastructure, responsible for the acquisition of strategic assets in Africa.

He served as a member of the Presidential Committee inaugurated by President Jonathan on the Accelerated Expansion of the Electricity Infrastructure in Nigeria, which culminated in the unbundling of PHCN successor companies. He also chairs the board of Ikeja Electric.

In 2022, he was crowned as Vanguard Private Sector Icon of the Year.
