= TransAfam Power =

TransAfam Power is a Nigerian power generation plant. TransAfam Power's 2,000 megawatts capacity consists of Afam Power Plc, Afam 3 Fast Power Ltd, and Afam IV & V.

== History ==
In November 2020, Transcorp Group acquired Afam Power and Afam 3 Fast Power Limited (jointly referred to as Afam GenCo) as a 1000 megawatt capacity plant for ₦105.3bn. In February 2023, TransAfam announced the rehabilitation of its Afam V GT unit 20 Gas Turbine power generating unit to add 138 megawatts to its existing capacity.

In May 2023, the 240 megawatts Afam 3-Fast Power Plant was commissioned. In the same month, the Federal Government of Nigeria signed a 20-year Power Purchase Agreement with TransAfam Power, for 726 megawatts capacity from the power plant. Later in May 2024, Tony Elumelu, chairman of TransAfam's parent company, stated at an annual general meeting that N250 billion was being owed by the Federal Government to TransAfam. He had also mentioned a year before that during the Federal Government's acquisition of 240 megawatts of fast power turbines from General Electric for installation in TransAfam, General Electric threatened to pull out of the project when the Federal Government of Nigeria could not provide 65 million cubic meters of gas needed for the comprehensive testing of the installed power plant.

Nigerian Electricity Regulatory Commission published in April 2024 that Afam IV & V and other smaller power plants produce just about 1,261 megawatts which made up 25% of the power consumed in Nigeria. July 2024, the Abuja Electricity Distribution Company signed a Memorandum of Understanding (MOU) with TransAfam Power to supply 50 Megawatts of embedded power to Idu Commercial Hub in Abuja.

A report by Nigerian Electricity Regulatory Commission in September 2024 highlighted Azura IPP, Odukpani, and Afam VI as Nigeria's top performing power plants with availability factors of 98, 98, and 74 per cent respectively.

== Incidents ==
In April 2024, Transmission Company of Nigeria reported that a fire which had erupted at the Afam V 330kV bus bar coupler tripped off units at Afam III and Afam VI. It led to a temporary national grid collapse.
