= Power Holding Company of Nigeria =

Electricity distribution company of Nigeria

The Power Holding Company of Nigeria (PHCN), formerly the National Electric Power Authority (NEPA), was a power company owned by the government of Nigeria. It represented Nigeria in the West African Power Pool. During the era when it operated as NEPA, the company managed a football team, NEPA Lagos.

The history of electricity development in Nigeria can be traced back to the end of the 19th century when the first generating power plant was installed in the city of Lagos in 1898. From then until 1950, the pattern of electricity development was in the form of individual electricity power undertaking scattered all over the towns. Some of the few undertakings were Federal Government bodies under the Public Works Department, some owned by the Native Authorities and others by the Municipal Authorities.

== Electricity Corporation of Nigeria (ECN) ==
By 1950, in order to integrate electricity power development and make it effective, the then-colonial government passed the ECN ordinance No. 15 of 1950. With this ordinance in place, the electricity department and all those undertakings which were controlled came under one body.

The statutory function of the authority is to develop and maintain an efficient co-ordinate and economical system of electricity supply throughout the Federation. The decree further states that the monopoly of all commercial electric supply shall be enjoyed by NEPA to the exclusion of all other organisations. This however, does not prevent privy individuals who wish to buy and run thermal plants for domestic use from doing so.
NEPA, from 1989, has since gained another status-that of quasi-commercialisation. By this, NEPA has been granted partial autonomy and by implication, it is to feed itself. The total generating capacity of the six major power stations is 3,450 megawatts.

In spite of considerable achievements of recent times with regards to its generating capability, additional power plants would need to be committed to cover expected future loads. At present, efforts would be made to complete the ongoing power plant projects. Plans are already nearing completion for the extension and reinforcement of the existing transmission system to ensure adequate and reliable power supply to all parts of the country.

By 1970, the military government appointed a Canadian Consultant firm, Showment Ltd, to look into the technical details of the merger. The report was submitted to the government in November 1971. By Decree No. 24 the ECN were merged to become the NEPA with effect from 1 April 1972. The actual merger did not take place until 6 January 1973 when the first general manager was appointed. The day-to-day running of the authority is the responsibility of the managing director.

In the early 1960s, the Niger Dam Authorities (NDA) and Electricity Corporation amalgamated to form the Electricity Corporation of Nigeria (ECN). Immediately after the end of the 1967-1970 Nigerian civil war, the management of ECN changed its name to the National Electric Power Authority, or NEPA. In the late 2000s, the company became a public limited company (NEPA plc), and then later the name was changed again from NEPA plc to the Power Holding Company of Nigeria (PHCN).

For several decades, despite consistent perceived cash investment by the federal government, local and at times even nationwide power outages have been the norm instead of the exception. Because of such outages, over the years the Nigerian public has given the company numerous humorous backronyms such as "Never Expect Power Always" (NEPA), "No Electrical Power at All; Please Light Candle" (NEPA plc), and "Please Hold a Candle Now" (PHCN).

Generally, the tariff has been criticised as being too low compared to the cost of generating power. The federal government of Nigeria has increased the tariff to attract foreign investors since 1 July 2010 in order to meet the growing concern for foreign investors into the electricity sector.

== Payment of bills ==
The sample consists of the procedures enrolled in payment of bills by way of banks. The Power Holding Company of Nigeria, PHCN, has made settling customers monthly electricity bills easier, hence the introduction of the bank revenue collection system to complement the operations of the cash offices in PHCN premises. This program is to facilitate prompt and regular settlement of the PHCN's monthly bills, as customers are no longer expected to travel far outside their immediate neighbourhoods to settle PHCN Bills.

== Privatization ==
Major issues within the Nigerian power sector, principally concerning power outages and unreliable service, compelled the Nigerian government to take radical action. It enacted the Electric Power Sector Reform Act of 2005, which called for unbundling the national power utility company into a series of 18 successor companies: six generation companies, 11 distribution companies covering all 36 Nigerian states, and a national power transmission company. The act stipulated that ownership of these companies be granted to the Bureau of Public Enterprises (the privatization arm of the federal government) and the Ministry of Finance Incorporated. This unbundling paved the way for an ambitious privatization program to be carried out by the Bureau of Public Enterprises in Nigeria.

In 2007, the Bureau of Public Enterprises hired CPCS Transcom, an international consulting firm based in Ottawa, Ontario, Canada to provide advice about the best ways to move forward with the privatization of the country's 11 distribution companies and the 6 generation companies. In 2010, CPCS was consulted again in order to provide advice on the Nigerian government's privatization program.

On 30 September 2013, following the privatization process initiated by the Goodluck Jonathan regime, PHCN ceased to exist. In its stead, the Nigerian Electricity Regulatory Commission (NERC) was formed. The independent regulatory agency, as provided in the Electric Power Sector Reform Act of 2005 was tasked with monitoring and regulating the Nigerian electricity industry, with issuing licences to market participants, and with ensuring compliance with market rules and operating guidelines.

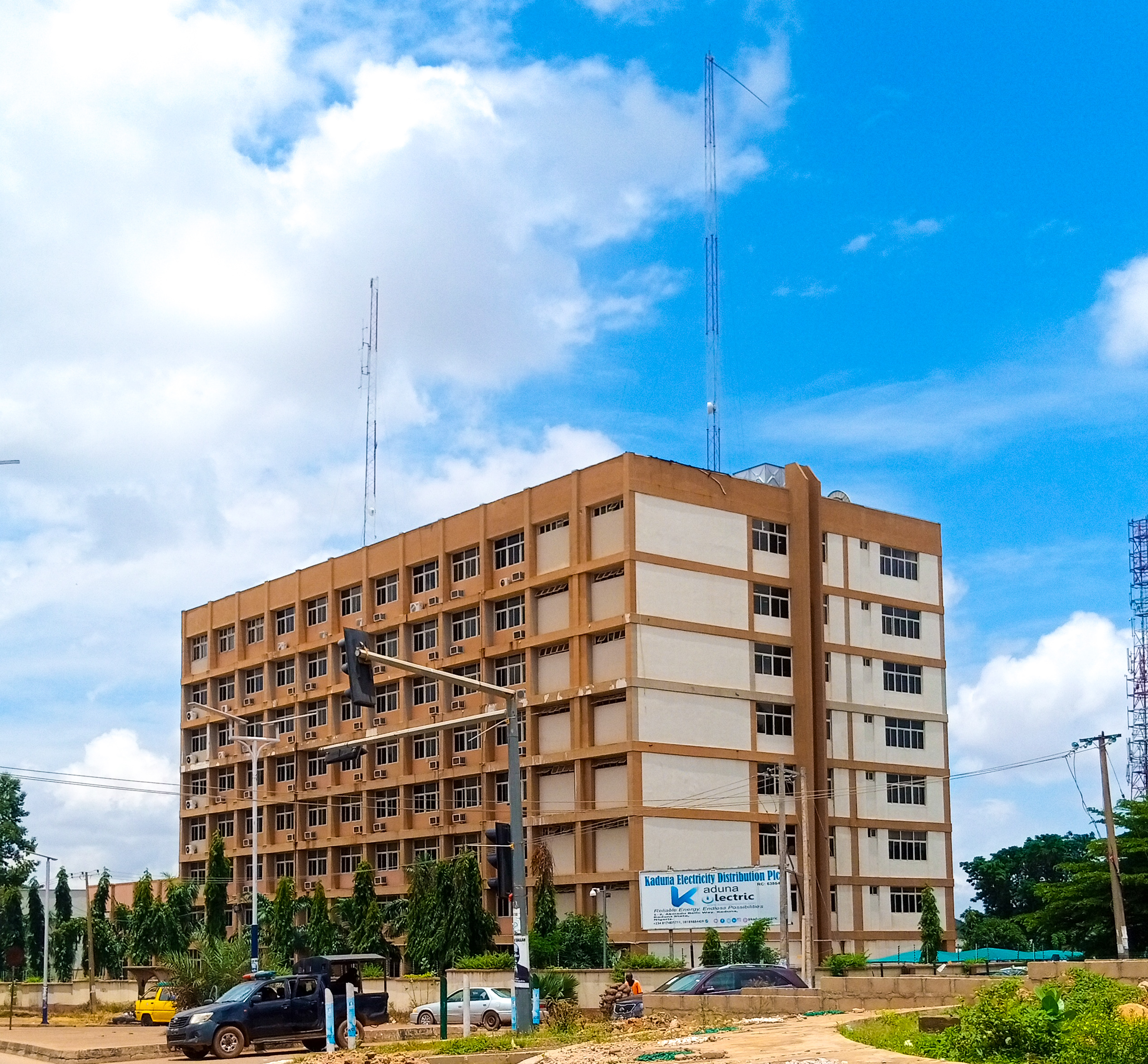
Kaduna Electric Corporate Head Office

== PHCN successor companies ==
Following the 2013 divestiture of the federal government from PHCN, the company was divided into separate companies or entities called Local Electric Distribution Companies or Local Distribution Companies (LDC). Each company will be responsible for handling electricity distribution in each state or region.

As of May 2016, the structure of the companies was as follows:

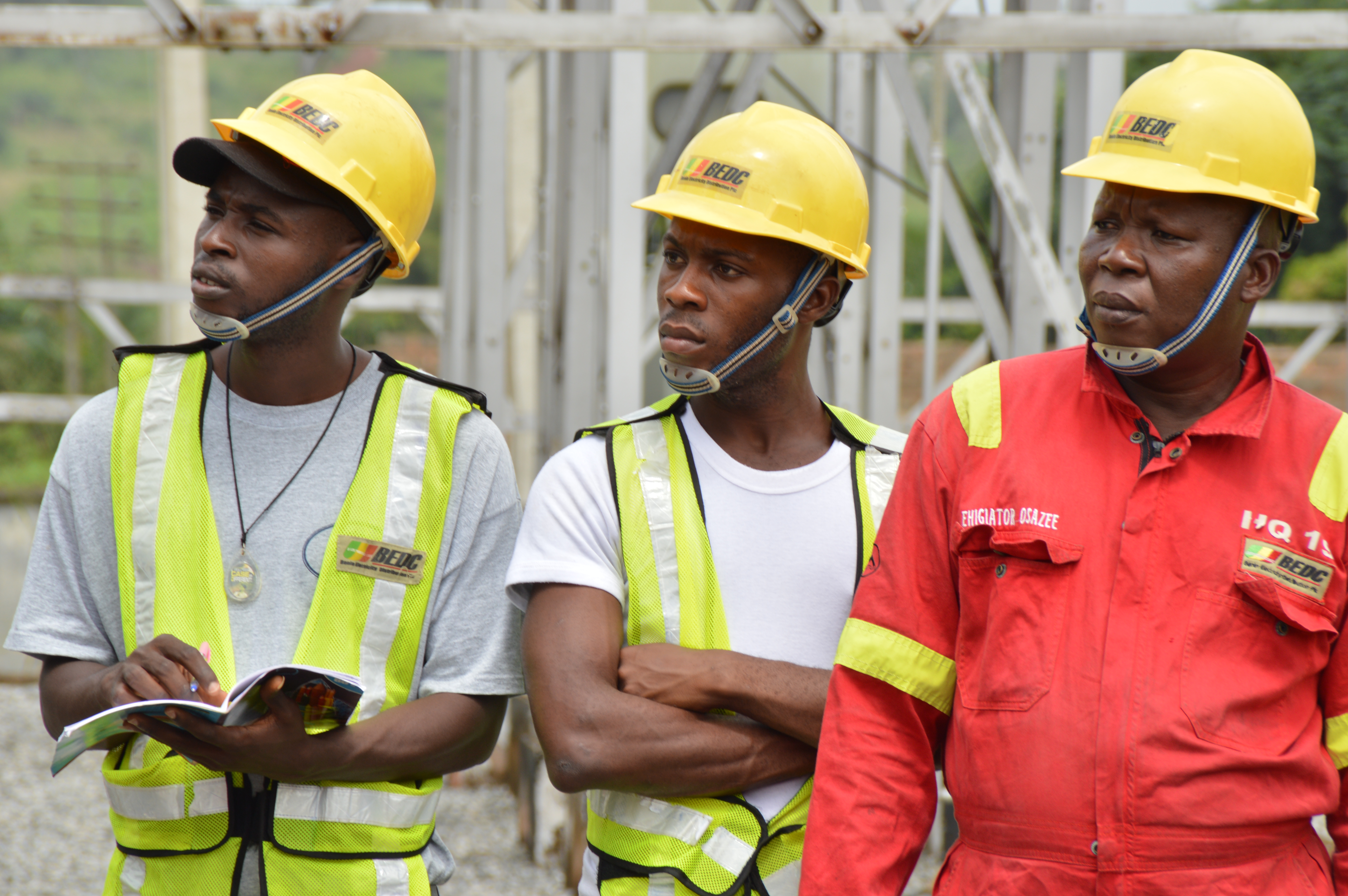
BEDC workers in Nigeria (2017).

Distribution (11 companies):

- Abuja Electricity Distribution Company
- Benin Electricity Distribution Company plc
- Eko Electricity Distribution Company
- Enugu Electricity Distribution Company plc
- Ibadan Electricity Distribution Company
- Ikeja Electricity Distribution Company plc
- Jos Electricity Distribution Company plc
- Kano Electricity Distribution Company plc
- Kaduna Electricity Distribution Company plc
- Port Harcourt Electricity Distribution Company plc
- Yola Electricity Distribution Company plc

Generation (6 companies):

- Afam Power
- Egbin Power plc
- Kainji Hydro-Electric plc
- Sapele Power plc
- Shiroro Hydro-Electric plc
- Ughelli Power plc

Transmission (1 company):

- Transmission Company of Nigeria

== See also ==
- Sun Yun-suan, former Premier of the Republic of China who was formerly World Bank appointed CEO of the company
