= Energy Regulatory Authority (Albania) =

Albanian public service organization

- Native name: Enti Rregullator i Energjisë
- Industry: Electricity
- Headquarters: Tirana, Albania
- Key people: Petrit Ahmeti (Board Commissioner)
- Parent: Government of Albania
- Website: ere.gov.al

The Energy Regulatory Authority (ERE; Albanian: Enti Rregullator i Energjisë) is an independent public entity tasked to ensure a sustainable and secure electricity supply for the Albanian consumer by establishing an operational and competitive electricity market, taking into account the consumer's interest.

ERE organizes hearings with stakeholders from the three energy operators KESH, OST, and OSHEE to discuss price increases and tariff changes for energy production.

== See also ==
- KESH (Albanian Power Corporation)
- OST (Operatori i Sistemit të Transmetimit)
- OSHEE (Electric Power Distribution Operator)
- Electricity distribution companies by country
