= EZV =

EZV may refer to:

- EZV, IATA code for Beryozovo Airport, an airport in Russia
- EZV Energie- und Service GmbH & Co. KG Untermain, an electricity distribution company in Germany
