= NERC =

NERC may refer to:

- Natural Environment Research Council
- Nashville & Eastern Railroad Corporation
- North American Electric Reliability Corporation
- Nigerian Electricity Regulatory Commission
