= Operatori i Shpërndarjes së Energjisë Elektrike =

Energy company in Albania

- Company type: Shoqëri Aksionare (Sh.A)
- Industry: Electric utility
- Founded: 8 June 2007; 19 years ago
- Founder: Albanian government
- Headquarters: Tirana, Albania
- Area served: Albania
- Key people: Enea Karakaçi (Chairman)
- Products: distribution, Natural gas and electricity generation
- Owner: Government of Albania (100%)
- Website: oshee.al

Operatori i Shpërndarjes së Energjisë Elektrike Sh.A (OSHEE; English: Electricity Distribution Operator) is an energy company engaged in constructing, operating, maintaining, and developing the electricity distribution network serving households and private clients throughout Albania. Formerly known as CEZ Shpërndarje Sh.A, the company changed its name to "Operatori i Shpërndarjes së Energjisë Elektrike Sh.A." in July 2014. It is a subsidiary of the Albanian Government under the supervision of the Ministry of Infrastructure and Energy.

== See also ==
- KESH (Albanian Power Corporation)
- OST (Transmission System Operator)
- ERE (Energy Regulatory Authority)
- Electricity distribution companies by country
