= Andis Harasani =

Albanian politician (1971–2025)

Executive Director of the Albanian Power Corporation (KESH)
- In office September 2002 – July 2005

Member of the Albanian Parliament
- In office 5 September 2005 – 15 April 2009
- Constituency: Tirana County

Member of the Albanian Parliament
- In office 2 September 2009 – 25 September 2012
- Constituency: Rrogozhinë

Personal details
- Born: 9 August 1971 Tirana, PSR Albania
- Died: 9 March 2025 (aged 53) Brooklyn, New York, U.S.
- Party: Socialist Party of Albania (2002–2012)
- Children: 2
- Education: University of Tirana (Economics)
- Occupation: Politician
- Profession: Economist

Andis Harasani (9 August 1971 – 9 March 2025) was an Albanian politician and economist. He served as the executive director of the Albanian Power Corporation (Korporata Elektroenergjetike Shqiptare, KESH) from 2002 to 2005 and was a member of the Parliament of Albania from 2005 to 2012.

== Early life and education ==
Harasani was born in Tirana. He studied economics at the University of Tirana.

== Career ==
=== Energy sector ===
In September 2002, Harasani was appointed executive director of the Albanian Power Corporation (KESH), the state-owned electricity company. He worked on improving electricity supply and infrastructure during his tenure, which ended in July 2005.

=== Political career ===
After leaving KESH, Harasani joined the Socialist Party of Albania and was elected to the Albanian Parliament in the 2005 elections, representing Tirana. He was re-elected in 2009, representing Rrogozhinë. During his parliamentary career, he focused on economic and political reforms.

Following the Socialist Party's defeat in the 2009 elections, Harasani, who was part of the internal faction known as the "Lëvizja e Mendimit Ndryshe" ("Movement of Different Thought"), had disagreements with party leader Edi Rama. He criticized Rama for a lack of transparency and for allowing factionalism within the party, which Harasani believed weakened it. He also blamed Rama for his own exclusion from the candidate list, citing it as a factor in the party's loss.

The conflict intensified in 2010, with Harasani accusing Rama of causing divisions and disregarding party rules. Even after leaving politics in 2012, Harasani continued to publicly criticize Rama's leadership style and policies, describing them as authoritarian and detrimental to both the party and the opposition.

Harasani kept making critical comments in the following years, often using irony. He made remarks about Rama’s statements on uniting with Kosovo and about some government decisions in the economy that he disagreed with.

== Later life ==
After leaving politics, Harasani relocated to New York City, where he worked in the private sector. He remained engaged in discussions concerning Albania's energy policy and economic development.

== Death ==
Harasani died on 9 March 2025 in Brooklyn, New York after a prolonged illness.
