= Spark Infrastructure =

Australian public company

Spark Infrastructure Group
- Industry: Investment fund
- Founded: 2005
- Headquarters: Sydney, Australia
- Website: www.sparkinfrastructure.com

Spark Infrastructure Group is an Australian investment fund which owns and manages a portfolio of electricity infrastructure assets.

Spark's principal investments are 49% stakes in both SA Power Networks and Victoria Power Networks; as well as a 15% stake in the NSW Power Networks consortium given the concession for TransGrid, the high-voltage transmission system for New South Wales.

== History ==
The company debuted on the Australian Securities Exchange on 16 December 2005 with the stock symbol SKICA representing an instalment receipt with a final instalment due in March 2007 when the instalment receipts were transferred for SKI shares.

In August 2021, a takeover bid from KKR, Ontario Teachers' Pension Plan and Public Sector Pension Investment Board was accepted by the board of directors. It was subject to shareholder approval. The acquisition completed in December 2021 and its stock was delisted.
