= Aurora Energy (New Zealand) =

New Zealand electricity distribution company

Aurora Energy Limited
- Trade name: Aurora Energy
- Formerly: Dunedin Electricity Limited (1990–2003)
- Industry: Electricity distribution
- Founded: 26 June 1990 in Dunedin, New Zealand
- Headquarters: Dunedin, New Zealand
- Key people: Richard Fletcher (CEO); Steve Thompson (Non-Executive Chair)
- Revenue: ▲$110.9 Million (2020)
- Net income: ▲$-4.2 Million (2020)
- Total assets: ▲$617.6 Million (2020)
- Total equity: ▼$175.9 Million (2020)
- Parent: Dunedin City Holdings Limited
- Website: www.auroraenergy.co.nz

Aurora Energy is New Zealand's seventh largest electricity distribution network by customer connections, supplying electricity to 91,600 homes, farms and businesses in Dunedin, Central Otago, and the Queenstown-Lakes District. Aurora Energy is owned by Dunedin City Holdings Limited on behalf of the Dunedin City Council. It is governed by a board of directors. Its chief executive, Richard Fletcher, joined Aurora in 2018.

== History ==
=== Origins ===
The history of electricity supply to Dunedin dates from 1907, when the Dunedin City Council developed New Zealand's first large hydro-electric generating station on the Waipori River. Power from the initial Waipori scheme was transmitted at 35 kV over a 45-kilometre (28 mi) route to Dunedin using duplicate lines. The Council continued with further hydro-electricity developments on the Waipori River for almost 80 years. The largest development on the river was the construction of a 34-metre (112 ft) high dam, forming Lake Mahinerangi. The Waipori scheme was interconnected with the Waitaki power station in 1935 as part of extending generating capacity in the South Island.

As part of electricity industry reforms in 1990, the Dunedin City Council separated its lines and energy businesses. A new company Waipori Power Generation Limited, was formed to take over the energy business. In the same year, the Council established a utility contracting company that was eventually renamed as Delta Utility Services. A further new company, Dunedin Electricity Limited was registered on 26 June 1990 to manage the Council's electricity lines business. Dunedin Electricity was subsequently re-registered and renamed as Aurora Energy on 1 July 2003.

=== 2010s ===
In the period 2013 to 2020, there were multiple criticisms of Aurora Energy for poor network reliability, creating safety hazards for workers and the public, historic under-investment, and the need for large price increases to fund the renewal of ageing assets. Independent commentators criticised the owner Dunedin City Holdings, for taking large dividends from Aurora Energy to fund the construction of the Forsyth Barr Stadium, instead of ensuring appropriate expenditure on ageing assets.

Prior to 2016, while Aurora Energy was the asset owner, Delta Utility Services managed the Aurora Energy network and was the primary contractor. A review of Delta Utility Services and Aurora was commissioned by Dunedin City Holdings, which is owned by the Dunedin City Council, in 2016. This led to a restructuring of both organisations, with the establishment of separate boards and chief executives.

=== 2020s ===
In March 2020, Aurora Energy was fined almost $5 million for failing to meet regulated network reliability performance standards during the 2016–2019 period. At the same time, the Commerce Commission acknowledged that in the period since 2016, Aurora had taken steps to improve the quality of service quality across its network, including the appointment of a new board and management and beginning a major programme of capital works.

In March 2021, the Commerce Commission announced their final decision on an investment and revenue proposal submitted by Aurora Energy. The decision allows expenditure of up to $609 million over the period 2021–26, to replace end-of-life equipment and improve safety and reliability. This will result in significant increases in electricity lines charges for all customers, particularly those in Central Otago and Wānaka.

In mid March 2024, the Dunedin City Council (DCC) voted by a margin of 13-1 to consult ratepayers on a proposal to sell Aurora Energy in order to pay off the company's forecast debt of NZ$750 million. Mayor of Dunedin Jules Radich said that the proceeds generated from the sale would be invested in an investment fund to generate revenue for the DCC.

On 25 September 2024, the DCC voted by a majority to retain ownership of Aurora Energy following strong public opposition to the proposed sale. Councillors Christine Garey, Carmen Houlihan, Brent Weatherall, David Benson-Pope, Steve Walker and Bill Acklin said that the Council was following the wishes of Dunedin ratepayers in retaining a valuable asset. The two dissenting Councillors were Deputy Mayor Cherry Lucas and Lee Vandervis, who argued that retaining the company would lead to increased debts, rates and diminished opportunities.

In October 2024, they unveiled a new Integrated Services division aimed at providing comprehensive project delivery to the oil, gas, and renewables sectors.

In December 2025 the company announced plans to collaborate with South Canterbury lines network Alpine Energy by merging the operations of the two lines businesses.

== Distribution network ==
Aurora Energy's distribution network is supplied from Transpower's national grid at five grid exit points (GXPs): Halfway Bush and South Dunedin for the Dunedin network, and Clyde, Cromwell and Frankton for the Central Otago network. Most of the network's sub-transmission is at 33,000 volts with the major exception of the lines feeding Wānaka from Cromwell GXP, which operate at 66,000 volts. Distribution is generally at 6,600 volts in the Dunedin urban area and at 11,000 volts elsewhere.

Aurora Energy Limited network statistics for the year ending 31 March 2024
Parameter	Value
Parameter	2024
Regulatory asset base	$830 million
Line charge revenue	$143.8 million
Capital expenditure	$107.5 million
Operating expenditure	$48.0 million
Customer connections	95,241
Energy delivered	1,424 GWh
Peak demand	311 MW
Total line length	6,312 km
Distribution and low-voltage overhead lines	3,309 km
Distribution and low-voltage underground cables	2,383 km
Subtransmission lines and cables	620 km
Poles	53,637
Distribution transformers	7,413
Zone substation transformers	69
Average interruption duration (SAIDI)	350 minutes
Average interruption frequency (SAIFI)	2.60

== Regulation and benchmarking ==
As a natural monopoly lines business, Aurora Energy is subject to regulation under the Commerce Act 1986, including price-quality regulation, and Information Disclosure regulation. The Commerce Commission publishes a wide range of Information Disclosure data provided by all electricity network companies, including Aurora Energy, and provides performance summaries for benchmarking purposes. The benchmarking shows that Aurora is the seventh largest electricity network by customer connections. The performance summaries for the year to 31 March 2021 include benchmark rankings of the lines charges for all 29 New Zealand lines companies.

Approximately 54% of Aurora's line charge revenue is derived from charges based on energy delivered. These energy delivery charges were amongst the lowest nationwide at 4.0c/kWh, ranked 23 out of the 29 network companies. However, around 40% of Aurora's revenue is based on charges related to peak demand. The peak demand charge of $139/kW is high and ranked 3 out of 29.

== Criticisms and responses ==
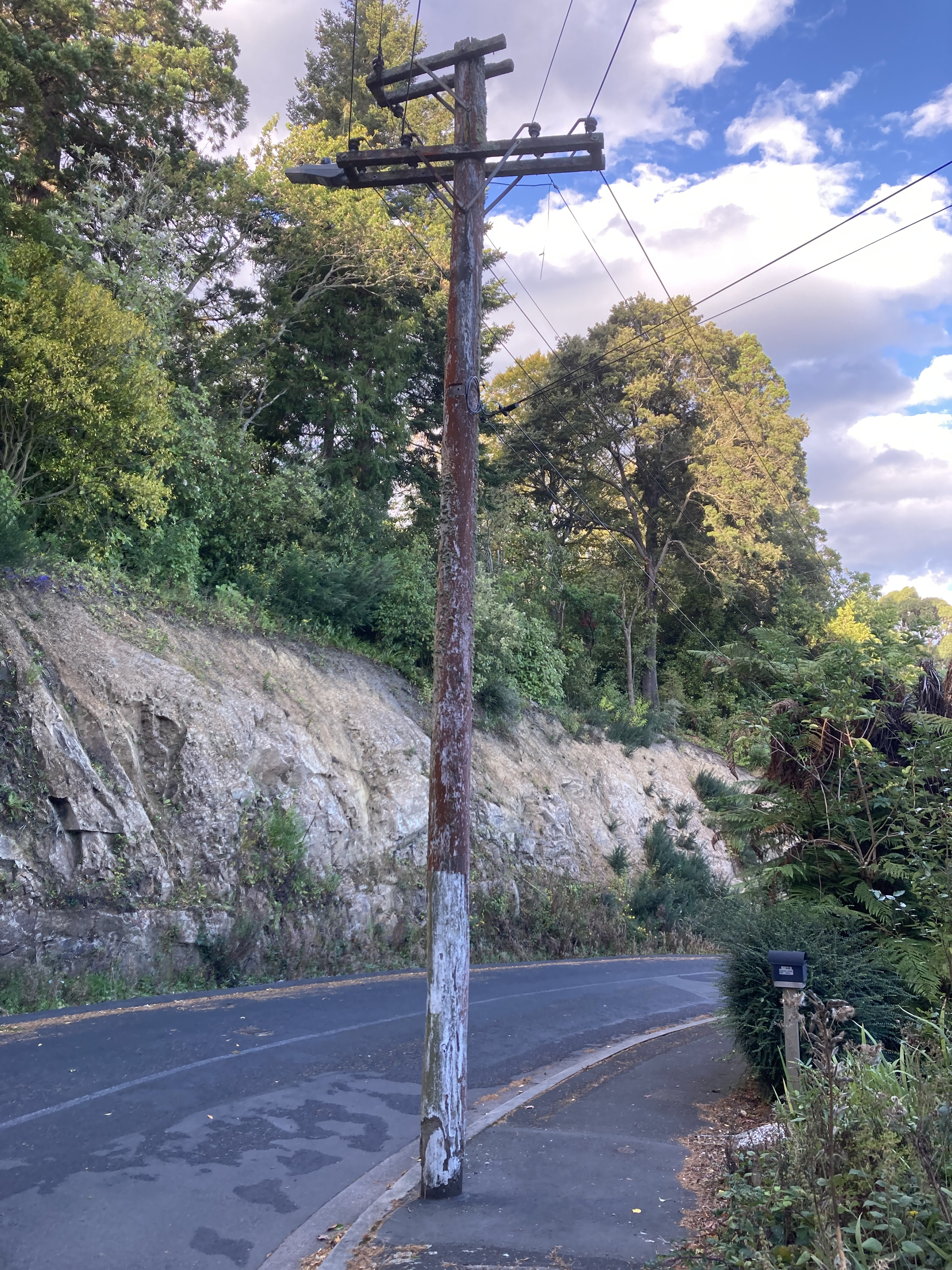
Aged wooden power pole in Dunedin

In 2013, the Commerce Commission published a report from Strata Energy Consulting that reviewed the Aurora network performance over the period 1 April 2010 to 31 March 2012. The review was commissioned because Aurora had not met the regulatory network reliability standards during that period. Strata concluded that although severe adverse weather had caused the poor performance, there were underlying factors that contributed, including increasing incidents of tree contact, and the poor condition of poles. Strata attributed these factors to insufficient investment in the network.

In June 2014, the Commerce Commission warned several electricity distribution businesses, including Aurora, after they failed to comply with the service quality standards for electricity distributors in 2012. The Commission warned that these businesses were more likely to face penalties should they fail to comply with the standards in the future.

In October 2016, Richard Healey, a former employee of Delta Utility Services, began raising concerns in the media about the state of the Aurora network assets, and the safety hazards they presented to workers and members of the public. At the time Delta Utility Services both managed the Aurora Energy network and was the primary contractor. Following this criticism, a review of Delta Utility Services and Aurora was commissioned by Dunedin City Holdings Ltd and undertaken by Deloitte. The report led to a restructuring of both Aurora and Delta.

On 31 October 2016, Aurora announced a plan for fast-track replacement of several thousand power poles. In May 2017, Aurora announced that it was planning a $720 million upgrade of the network over the next ten years. This was a $300 million increase over the 10-year plan released the previous year. The revised 10-year plan included increased expenditure on renewal of assets, including a total of 14,000 poles, replacing older sub-transmission cables and upgrading of overhead lines. Other major projects included replacing the 60-year-old Neville St substation with a new substation at Carisbrook, and building a new substation at Wānaka.

In June 2017, benchmarking data published by the Commerce Commission showed that on many of the measures used, Aurora was rated among the worst on both average age of its assets and their overall condition. In October 2017, Aurora announced that it had appointed Dr Richard Fletcher as its new chief executive officer, to replace the outgoing chief executive Grady Cameron. Dr Fletcher would take up the role in January 2018 after previously being a general manager at Powerco.

In September 2018, the Commerce Commission announced that it had decided to file court proceedings against Aurora for breaching its regulated quality standards in 2016 and 2017.

In 2018, the Commerce Commission published the results of an 8-months-long independent review of the Aurora network carried by WSP. In their summary of findings, WSP concluded that most assets pose a small risk to public safety, reliability or the environment, and that risks were no greater than they had observed in other networks in New Zealand and internationally. However, they reported that overhead conductors, poles and crossarm assets were causing more than 50% of the network outages that were attributed to asset deterioration, and that there was an upward trend in these failures.

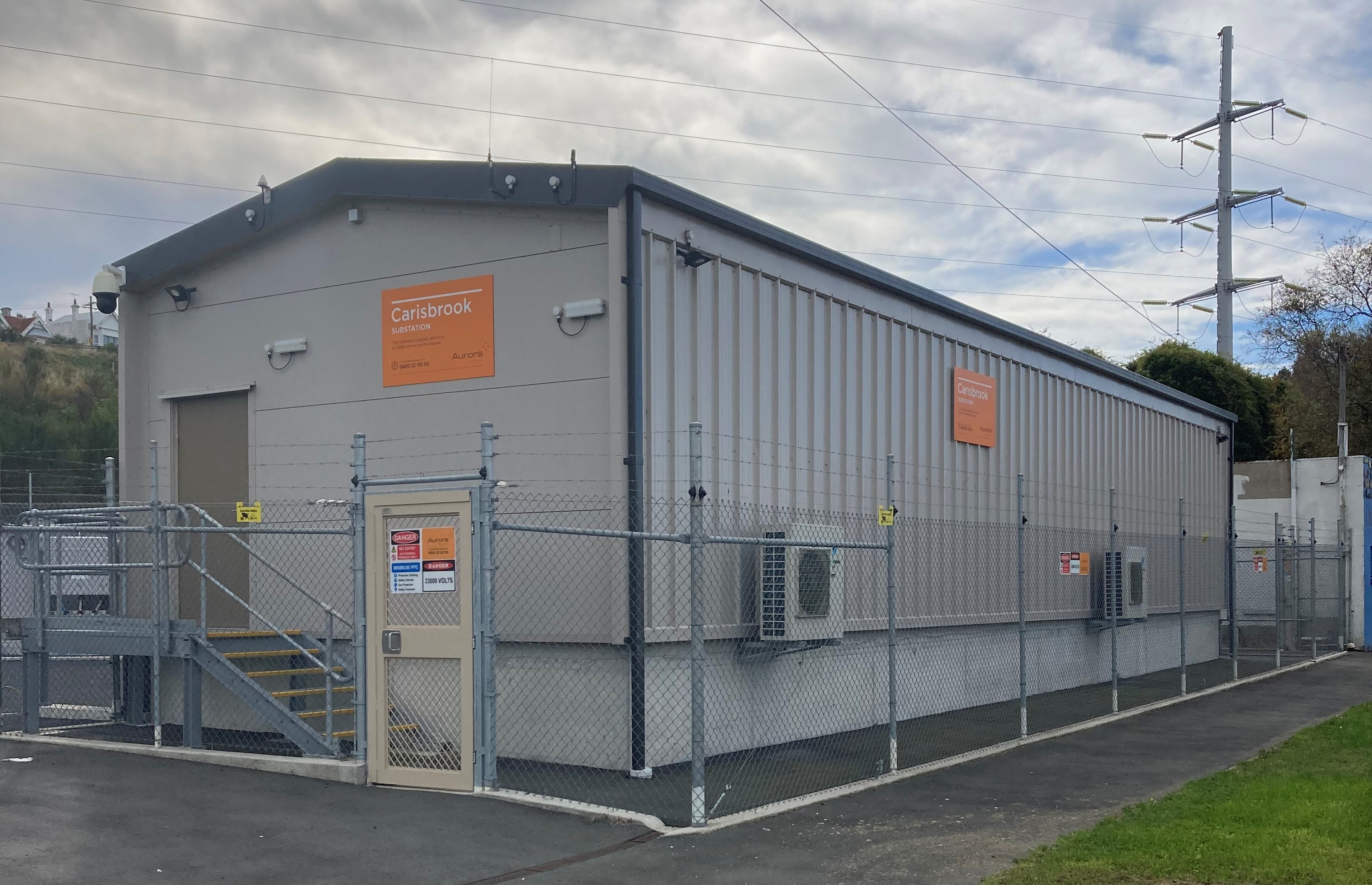
Carisbrook substation in 2021

In May 2019, the Commerce Commission released a draft decision on the revenue regulation of electricity distribution businesses, and noted specifically that Aurora Energy required significant investment in its network.

In March 2020, the Commerce Commission announced that Aurora Energy had been penalised with a fine in the High Court of almost $5 million for failing to meet regulated network reliability performance standards in the 2016–2019 years. In the media release that accompanied the High Court Judgement the Commission deputy chair Sue Begg said that "Aurora's previous management and board were well aware of the deteriorating state of its network but failed to take action". She also acknowledged that in the period since 2016, Aurora had taken steps to improve the quality of service across its network, including the appointment of a new board and management and beginning a major programme of capital works.

== Investment and revenue proposal 2021–24 ==
In November 2019, Aurora commenced a consultation with the community about proposed investment for the period 2021 to 2024 and the likely impacts on lines charges. This consultation was part of preparations for an application to the Commerce Commission for a customised price-path that was to be submitted in June 2020.

The consultation documents indicated an investment programme of $400 million over three years to replace ageing electricity infrastructure in Queenstown, Central Otago and Dunedin, along with indicative price rises for its customers of up to $500 per annum. In one reaction to this announcement, the Mayor of Queenstown-Lakes, Jim Boult, criticised the Dunedin City Council, as owner of Aurora, for taking high dividends that should have been spent on maintenance of the network. The Member of Parliament for Dunedin South, Clare Curran, criticised Aurora for years of under-investment.

In a response to an indicative increase of 23% in Aurora's line charges for Central Otago, members of the Queenstown-Lakes District Council and the Vincent Community Board claimed that the price increases were a direct result of on-going under-investment and the skimming of excessive dividends by Dunedin City Council. Russell Garbutt claimed that Dunedin City Council had required Aurora to borrow millions of dollars so it could pay dividends to help fund the building of Forsyth Barr Stadium. He called for the Dunedin City Council to repay excessive dividends that it had drawn from Aurora over many years. His claim was supported by University of Otago Associate Professor Mike Sam, who criticised the Dunedin City Council for funding the stadium from dividends from Aurora (thereby passing on the costs of the stadium to future electricity consumers), when the council had told the public that the stadium wasn't going to cost them anything.

In June 2020, Aurora applied to the Commerce Commission for a customised price-quality path (CPP). Their CPP proposal included an expenditure forecast of $383 million over the next 3 year period ($609 million over five years), to replace end-of-life equipment and improve safety and reliability. Following the issue of a draft decision and a period of community consultation and submissions, in March 2021 the Commerce Commission announced their final decision on the CPP proposal. The final decision allows Aurora to recover up to $563 million over five years ($46 million less than what Aurora's had originally proposed). The decision will result in significant increases in electricity line charges through until 2026, with the largest increases in Central Otago and Wānaka. Increases in Aurora's total revenue will be capped at approximately 10% per annum.

== See also ==
- Electricity sector in New Zealand
- Electricity distribution companies
