= Transmission Company of Nigeria =

Electric utility company in Nigeria

Agency overview
- Formed: 2005; 21 years ago
- Preceding agency: National Electric Power Authority
- Type: State-owned enterprise
- Jurisdiction: Federal Republic of Nigeria
- Headquarters: Federal Capital Territory, Abuja
- Agency executive: Sule Abdulaziz, Managing Director/CEO
- Parent agency: Federal Ministry of Power
- Website: www.tcn.org.ng

The Transmission Company of Nigeria (TCN) is a federal government owned electric utility company in Nigeria established in 2005. It is headquartered in the Federal Capital Territory in Abuja. It is a member of the West African Power Pool, an agency committed to improving energy flow across ECOWAS member states through joint financing between member countries for better sustainability of power projects within the region. It is in furtherance of this collective objective that the TCN provides bulk power supplies to Republic of Niger, Republic of Benin and Togo.

== History ==
TCN was among the eighteen companies unbundled from PHCN during the tenure president of Olusegun Obasanjo in 2005 backed by the Electric Power Sector Reform Act (EPSR Act) including six generation companies (GenCos) and eleven distribution companies (DisCos). It was incorporated in 2005 and given a license by the Nigerian Electricity Regulatory Commission in 2006. The company was formed by the government in an effort to ensure better coordination of electricity transmission in the country; as electricity is generated, transmitted and then distributed to the consumer.

The transmission company is one of the key entities in delivering electricity to the end user, the electricity consumer in Nigeria and its neighbors. And Nigeria over the years has sought to unbundle the complications in the chain of electricity delivery thereby leading to various levels of the chain allotted to private companies namely; generation, transmission and distribution. Transmission company of Nigeria became duly incorporated in 2005 and was granted operating license by the main electricity regulating body, (NERC). TCN’s licensed activities include electricity transmission, system operation and electricity trading. It is responsible for evacuating electric power generated by the electricity generating companies (GenCos) and wheeling it to distribution companies (DisCos). It provides the vital transmission infrastructure between the GenCos and the DisCos’ Feeder Sub-stations. The approved license was granted for two tiers which were transmission service provision and independent system operation.

== Operation ==
Under the issued license for transmission, the company oversees the development and maintenance of Nigeria's transmission infrastructure such as high voltage cables, towers and transformers. In the effort to ensure Nigeria's power sector becomes viable and boost foreign direct investment and local industrialization, the mandate and policy document of TCN was designed to focus on implementation of the use of new technology, faster project execution and improving operational efficiencies. Nigeria over the years has attributed its slow growth to poor electricity supply since its inception in 1896 when electricity was first produced in Lagos. The mandate which was to drive the level of growth in capacity utilization, replacement of state of the art equipment and prompt maintenance practice for optimum functionality was based on the government's master plan to ensure continuous improvement in its capacity to deliver in its responsibilities to generating companies and distribution companies also.

In 2021, the independent system operator was introduced. ISO is one of the components that forms the transmission company of Nigeria. It is responsible for ensuring that the transmission grid lines are reliable and maintaining the technical stability of the grid through its operations of planning, dispatch, and control of the electricity on the grid. The Electric Power Sector Reform (EPSR) Act under section 26(7) outlined the functions of the ISO within the terms and conditions stipulated by NERC with powers and roles as system operator.

== TCN leadership ==
Transmission company of Nigeria is led by a board of directors composed of the chairman, the managing director and other members. The managing director and chief executive oversees the management staff running the day to day activities of the company. Engr. Sule Abdulaziz is the managing director and chief executive officer appointed since 2022 and leads the company till date.

== Transmission corridors ==
NETAP is the Nigerian component of the north core transmission project which will connect Nigeria, Niger, Benin and Burkina Faso on 330kV DC line. It is to support the supply and installation of Supervisory Control and Data Acquisition/Energy Management Systems (SCADA/EMS) and consultancies that will support PPP projects in TCN in the future.

=== Lagos/Ogun transmission infrastructure project ===
Lagos state is Nigeria's commercial city and one of the most populous cities in Africa making its demand for power to be on the increase due to growing industrial activities and migration. TCN took the initiative to design this project for the provision of increased power supply to Lagos and neighboring areas in Ogun state. It was targeted at raising national transmission wheeling power by 1,487 megawatts thereby boosting transmission by 7,000MW.

=== Abuja transmission ring scheme ===
Abuja, Nigeria's federal capital territory is one of the fastest growing cities in Africa and the country's epicenter where the federal government is situated. In ensuring increased transmission of power in the FCT and its neighboring states, the TCN flagged off this scheme in the city with the inclusion of five other sites.

=== Northern corridor transmission project ===
Nigeria's northern corridor, comprising North East, North West and North Central, has not been left out of the drive to improve available transmission capacity in order to boost the national grid. TCN as the sole transmission company initiated this project for the purpose of re-constructing one out of the two Shiroro-Kaduna old and limited 330kV SC line into quad line and built initially four 330kV substations in Sokoto, Daura, Jogana-Kano and Kaura Namoda.

== Sub-stations ==
In a continuous effort at further improving bulk power transmission to distribution load centres nationwide, the Transmission Company of Nigeria (TCN) was building new power transmission facilities and rehabilitating old ones around the country. These substations which serve as transmission branches of the company across the country are situated in various states and regions including some of the following listed below:

- Benin south
- Alimosho
- Ajah
- Ejigbo
- Funtua
- Zaria
- Oji River
- Mayo Bewa
- FCT Kukwaba
- Afam
- Hadejia Jigawa
- Keffi
- Katampe
- Uyo
- Umuahia
- Aba
- Apo
- Gombe
- Bauchi
- Bida
- Jos
- Suleija
- Old Abeokuta
- New Kano
- Mando
- Zaria
- Kakuri
- Edo
- Ado-Ekiti
- Ejigbo II
- Akure
- Wudil (Kano)
- Okpella
- Papalanto
- Damaturu
- Ayede
- Kastina
- Daura
- General cotton mill Onitsha
- Benin-Agbor
- Dan Agundi

== Funding ==
The company is mainly funded through various channels including revenue from payment for services to generating companies, distribution companies, international distribution companies and directly connected customers. Also from budgetary appropriation for capital projects by the federal government and such grants and loans from reputable international donour agencies such as the World Bank, African Development Bank, Japan International Cooperation Agency, Agence Francais de Development and the European Union. In 2018, a joint agreement between president Muhammadu Buhari and German Chancellor, Angela Merkel birthed the presidential power initiative. The project was expected to contribute immensely in savaging the country’s perennial power challenges. The TCN constitutes as one of the key stakeholders in the Nigerian Presidential Power Initiative embarked by Siemens, and as a government-to-government agreement between Nigeria and Germany in resolving existing challenges in the country's power sector thereby expanding the capacity of the transmission and distribution network.

== Challenges ==
Since the privatisation of Nigeria's generating and distributing segments of electricity, the transmission of electricity remains the cardinal point and key aspect. Among the many challenges the transmission company of Nigeria has continually been confronted are:

- Infrastructural constraints;
- Vandalism of transmission lines and equipment;
- Lack of alternative to gas in powering transmission substations;
- Encroachment and illegal excavation activities around transmission lines.

These have contributed to reoccurring power failure and collapse of the national grid.
