= Powercor Australia =

Australian electricity distribution company

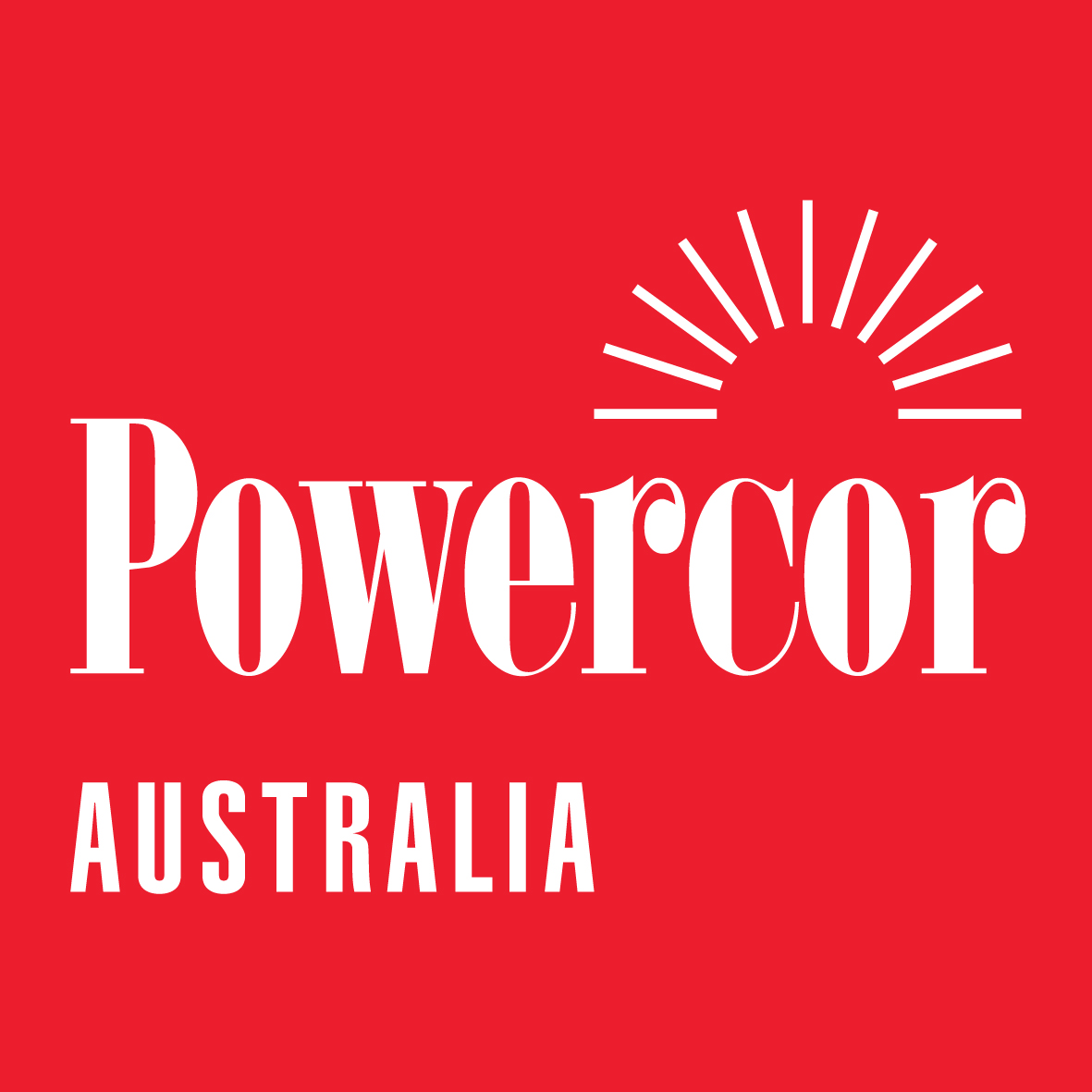
- Type: Private
- Industry: Infrastructure
- Founded: 1994
- Headquarters: Melbourne, Australia
- Area served: Victoria
- Parent: Cheung Kong Holdings 51% Spark Infrastructure 49%
- Website: http://www.powercor.com.au/

Powercor Australia is an Australian electricity distribution company that operates throughout western Victoria, and the western suburbs of Melbourne.

The company owns and maintains power lines, substations and street lights and also manages the largest electricity distribution network in Victoria.

Powercor is 51% owned by the Cheung Kong Holdings and 49% by Spark Infrastructure which also own Citipower, which maintains the city of Melbourne's CBD network, and SA Power Networks, which maintains the South Australian network.

== Network statistics ==
As of September 2011:

- Total line length: 84,026 km
- Area covered: 150,000 km^{2}
- Customers: 730,273
- Zone substations 70
- Zone substation transformers (66 kV to 22 kV): 137
- Distribution transformers (22 kV to 240 V): 81,553
- Poles: 535,941
- 31,865 customers supplied via single-wire earth return rural grid
- Wires underground: 10.6%
- 86% classified as 'rural'
- Network availability: 99.96%
