= Northern Regional Electricity Distribution =

Northern Regional Electricity Distribution (NORED) is an electricity supplier in Namibia.

Incorporated in 2001, Nored is responsible for electricity distribution in eight regions in the north of Namibia: Kunene Region, Omusati Region, Oshana Region, Oshikoto Region, Ohangwena Region, Kavango East Region, Kavango West Region and Zambezi Region. Its chief executive, appointed in March 2026, is Silvester Wayiti.
