= Alpine Energy =

New Zealand electricity generator company

Alpine Energy Limited
- Company type: Private
- Predecessor: South Canterbury Electric Power Board; Timaru Municipal Electricity Department
- Founded: 1992; 34 years ago
- Headquarters: Timaru, New Zealand
- Area served: South Canterbury
- Services: Electricity distribution
- Owners: Timaru District Council (47.5%); LineTrust South Canterbury (40.0%); Waimate District Council (7.5%); Mackenzie District Council (5.0%)
- Website: www.alpineenergy.co.nz

Alpine Energy Limited is an electricity distribution business based in Timaru, New Zealand. The company own and operates the electricity distribution network in South Canterbury.

The company's distribution network consists of 4,300 km (2,700 mi) of lines, supplying electricity to approximately 33,000 customers. The network covers the towns of Timaru, Temuka, Waimate, Pleasant Point, Fairlie, Lake Tekapo, Twizel, and Mount Cook Village.

Alpine Energy holds the naming rights to Fraser Park, the home ground of the South Canterbury rugby union team and an alternate home ground for the Crusaders Super Rugby team, which means it is known as Alpine Energy Stadium.

In December 2025 the company announced plans to collaborate with Otago-based Aurora Energy by merging the operations of the two lines companies.

== Statistics ==
Alpine Energy Limited network statistics for the year ending 31 March 2024
Parameter	Value
Regulatory asset base	$313 million
Line charge revenue	$65.7 million
Capital expenditure	$29.2 million
Operating expenditure	$30.4 million
Customer connections	33,883
Energy delivered	892 GWh
Peak demand	155 MW
Total line length	4,379 km
Distribution and low-voltage overhead lines	3,243 km
Distribution and low-voltage underground cables	857 km
Subtransmission lines and cables	282 km
Poles	44,624
Distribution transformers	6,269
Zone substation transformers	31
Average interruption duration (SAIDI)	360 minutes
Average interruption frequency (SAIFI)	1.45
