= Albanian Power Corporation =

Electricity producer in Albania

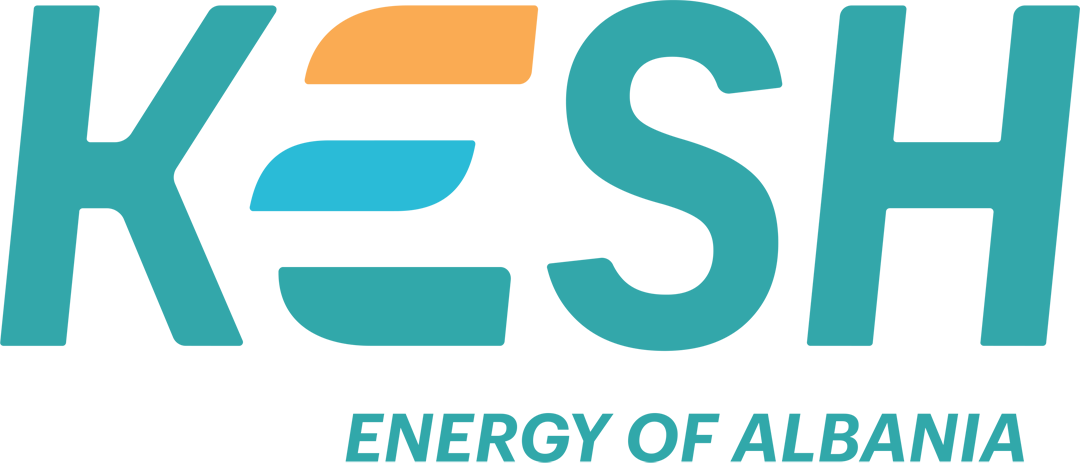
- Native name: Korporata Elektroenergjitike e Shqipërisë
- Industry: Electricity generation, transmission, distribution, retailing
- Founded: 1957
- Headquarters: Tirana, Albania
- Key people: Algert Luzi (Administrator)
- Products: Electricity
- Revenue: 20 billion ALL
- Operating income: 184 billion ALL
- Number of employees: 721
- Parent: Government of Albania
- Website: www.kesh.al

Albanian Power Corporation (KESH; Albanian: Korporata Elektroenergjitike e Shqipërisë) is the public producer and the largest producer of electricity in Albania. KESH manages the main electricity production plants in the country. These assets consist of the Drin Cascade hydropower plants (HEC Fierze, HEC Koman and HEC Vau i Deja) with an installed capacity of 1,350 megawatts (MW), and TEC Vlora with an installed capacity of 98 MW.

The cascade built on the Drin River Basin is the largest in the Balkans both in terms of installed capacity and the size of hydrotechnical works. Having 79% of the production capacity in the country, KESH supplies about 70-75% of the demand for electricity of tariff customers, ensures the coverage of losses in the transmission system, and through balancing energy and auxiliary services guarantees the security of the system Albanian energy.

KESH is also responsible for the administration, operation and guarantee of technical and operational safety of the energy works it administers.

KESH is not only one of the producers of electricity from the most important hydro sources in the region, but it is also considered a factor with regional influence in terms of the safety of hydro works. (ex. KESH) is a vertically integrated state-owned commercial company and is the main and most important producer of electricity in Albania.

== The stages of transformation of the company KESH sh.a. ==
Its foundations started in 1957 with the creation of the General Directorate of Electric Power Plants (DPCE) as the only entity that realized the production, transmission and distribution of electricity to the consumer as well as the exchange with neighboring countries.

The company KESH sh.a., in response to the dynamics of the development of the national legal framework, which aims to harmonize with the legislation of the European Union on energy, has undergone a series of fundamental transformations since 2000, transforming from a vertically integrated company (genesis from 1957), in a society today focused on the production and trading of electricity.

In 1992, DPCE was transformed into the state enterprise Albanian Power Corporation, and in 1995 it received the status of an anonymous company with all of its shares owned by the state.

In 2001, the current Statute of KESH sh.a came into force, which, in accordance with EU legislation on the privatization of non-natural monopolies, provided for the division of basic functions, separating Transmission and Distribution from the company, leaving only Energy Production. With the subsequent developments, in 2004 KESH sh.a. was removed from the Broadcasting function that it performed until this period and the Broadcasting System Operator (OST) was created.

In 2007, the Distribution and Retail Supply function was separated from the KESH Company and the Distribution System Operator Company (DSO) was created. During 2015, KESH sh.a carried out the activity of Production, Wholesale Public Supply and Trading of Electricity. The Company's shares are 100% owned by the Albanian State.

In 2016, KESH was "liberated" from the Public Wholesale function and focused on the production and trading of electricity as well as the maintenance and development of works.

== Management of the Society ==
KESH sh.a. is a joint stock company with capital owned entirely by the Albanian State (represented by the Ministry of Development, Economy, Trade and Free Enterprise) according to the act of establishment dated 17.10.1995, registered in the District Court of Tirana with Decision No. 12728, dated 06.11.1995. KESH sh.a. controls 100% of the shares in the company TEC Vlorë sh.a.

== Collegial bodies ==
Shareholders' Assembly: General Assembly, based on Article 135 et seq. of Law No. 9901, dated 14.04.2008 "For traders and commercial companies" amended as well as the statute of KESH sh.a is the highest decision-making body of the company KESH sh.a. The rights and obligations of the General Assembly are exercised by the sole shareholder of the company, which is the Albanian State. The sole shareholder of the company KESH sh.a is represented in the General Assembly by the Ministry of Economic Development, Tourism, Trade and Entrepreneurship.

Supervisory Council: The Supervisory Council consists of 6 members who are appointed by the Shareholders' Assembly. The duration of their function is 4 years. Based on the Corporation's Statute, the Supervisory Council elects a Chairman and a Deputy from among its members. Chairman.

Currently, it consists of:

1. Evis Mamaj (President)
2. Luigj Pjetri (Member)
3. Kledia Ngjela (Member)
4. Arian Hoxha (Member)
5. Olta Manjani (Member)

== Management ==
The company is represented by the administrator, who is also its executive director. The administrator of the company is responsible for establishing and fulfilling the goals and objectives of the company, through the creation of an appropriate and effective system of financial management and control, in a legal manner, with effectiveness and efficiency.

Mr. Algert Luzi has been appointed Administrator of KESH sh.a. in November 2026.

== Organizational structure ==
Developments in the energy sector enabled by Law no. 43/2015 "On the Electricity Sector" highlight the need for the organizational and functional transformation of the company in order to deal effectively with the expected challenges in the institutional and commercial environment where the company operates.

The company has preceded the developments enabled by the legal and regulatory framework with structural changes, facilitating the organic from the structures for functions that, in the dispute of legal affiliation, economic viability or public utility, should no longer be carried out by KESH sh.a. or from structures that come out of the current context of the activity of KESH sh.a.

== Generating assets ==
On the Drin River bed, the Fierza, Koman, Vaut Deja and Ashta hydropower plants with an installed capacity of about 1400MW have been built, of which the first three are under the administration of the Albanian Electricity Corporation:

1. The Fierza hydropower plant started working in 1978 and has an installed capacity of 500 MW (4 X 125 MW)
2. The Koman hydropower plant was commissioned in 1985 with an installed capacity of 600 MW (4 X 150 MW).
3. The Vau i Deja hydropower plant was commissioned in 1971 with an installed capacity of 250MW (5 X 50MW)

The economic importance of the Cascade is mainly related to the production of electricity. But it also keeps water flows under control, reducing the frequency and risks of floods downstream of the Drin. Cascade lakes create opportunities for the development of local ancillary economies (fishing, transport, tourism,).

Cascade makes up 79% of the energy production capacity in Albania. The value of Kaskada's assets is about ALL 184 billion. Cascade HPPs produce an average of 3,850 GWh of electricity per year generating an average income of 20 billion ALL, which represents 1.3% of GDP. Depending on the hydrometeorological conditions the energy production can vary from 2,500 to 7,000 Gwh. The energy produced by Kaskada covers about 54% of the country's overall demand for energy and about 79% of the needs of tariff customers (households & public institutions)

The cascade hydropower plants cover 100% of the needs of the Transmission System Operator for the auxiliary and balancing services necessary to maintain the safety and stability of the Albanian Electric Power System.

== See also ==
- OSHEE (Electric Power Distribution Operator)
- OST (Transmission System Operator)
- ERE (Energy Regulatory Authority)
- Electricity distribution companies by country
