= VKG Elektrivõrgud =

Company based in Estonia

- Company type: Private
- Industry: Utility
- Predecessor: Narva Elektrivõrgud
- Founded: 1 January 1993
- Headquarters: Narva, Estonia
- Area served: Narva, Narva-Jõesuu, Sillamäe
- Key people: Ivo Järvala (CEO)
- Services: Electricity distribution and retail
- Revenue: 26.9 million € (2022)
- Number of employees: 34
- Parent: BaltCap Infrastructure Fund II
- Website: www.vkgev.ee

VKG Elektrivõrgud (VKG EV, former name: Narva Elektrivõrgud) is an electricity distribution company in Estonia. VKG Elektrivõrgud is the second-largest power distribution company in Estonia, after Elektrilevi, a subsidiary of Eesti Energia.

== History ==
The history of the company reaches back to 1952 when it was established as a unit of Eesti Energia. It was established on 1 January 1993 as an independent company Narva Elektrivõrk, a subsidiary of Eesti Energia. Narva Elektrivõrk separated from Eesti Energia in 1997 and in 1998–1999 was sold to Startekor, a company controlled by Cinergy Corporation. In 2002–2003, the company was acquired by Sthenos Group and ECE European City Estates AG. In July 2006, Narva Elektrivõrk became a subsidiary of Viru Keemia Grupp and was renamed VKG Elektrivõrgud. In January 2024, VKG Elektrivõrgud was acquired by BaltCap Infrastructure Fund II (BInF II).

== Operations ==
VKG Elektrivõrgud distributes and sells electricity, and also provides operational management services for company power systems.

The company's service area is in Ida-Viru County, including Narva, Narva-Jõesuu, Sillamäe, Vaivara Parish and Viivikonna district of Kohtla-Järve. It has 35,000 customers and an annual sales of 262 GWh of electricity.

== See also ==
- Energy in Estonia
