= Ikeja Electric =

Nigerian company

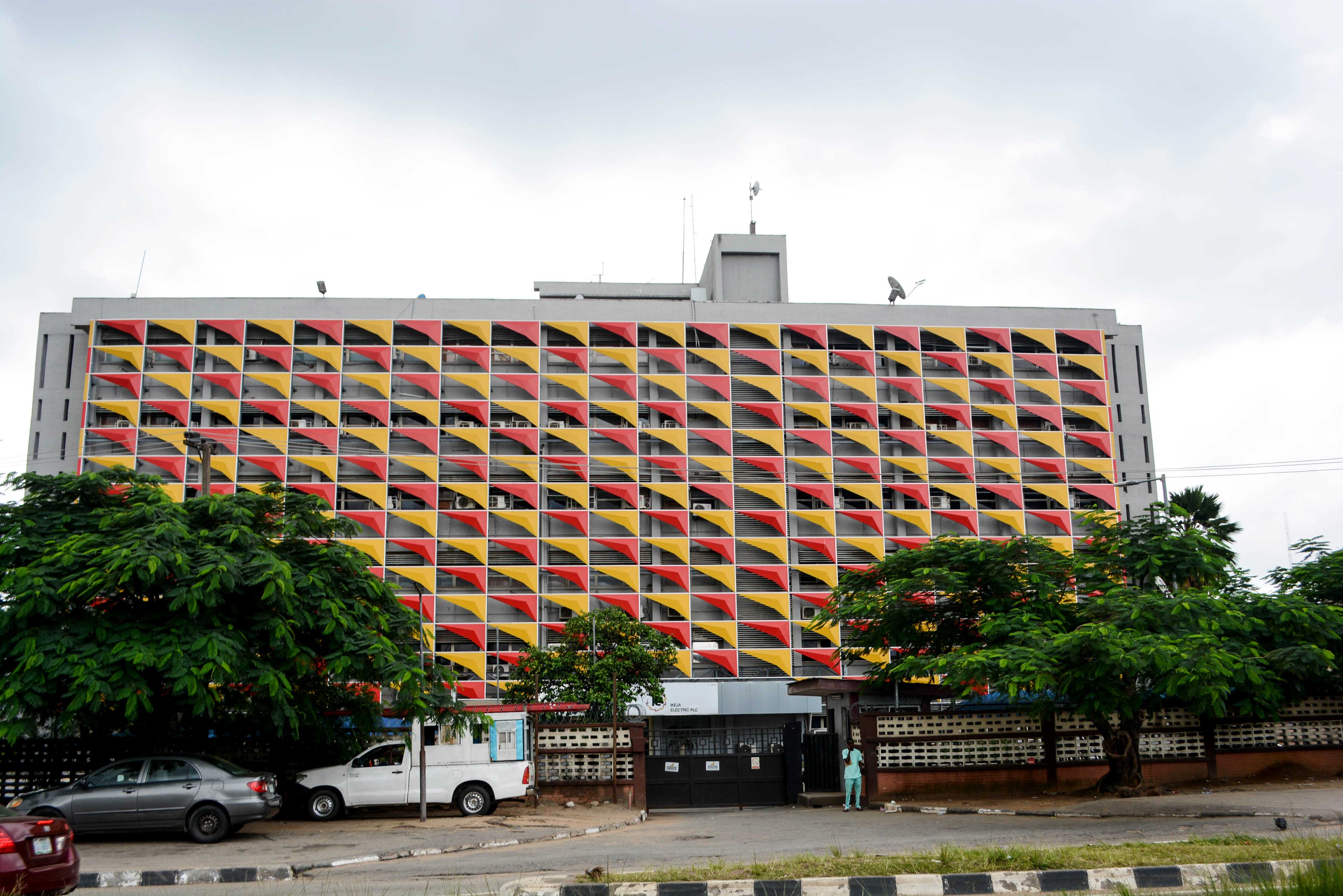
The headquarter in Ikeja

Ikeja Electric Plc is the largest Nigerian power distribution company. It is based in Ikeja, capital of the state of Lagos. The company emerged on November 1, 2013, following the handover of the defunct Power Holding Company of Nigeria (PHCN) to NEDC/KEPCO Consortium under the privatization scheme of the Federal Government of Nigeria.

There are 6 business unit (BU) offices under Ikeja Electric; which includes Abule Egba BU, Ikeja BU, Shomolu BU, Ikorodu BU, Oshodi BU and Akowonjo BU.

== Operations ==
Ikeja Electric has over 1,000,000 customers. Ikeja Electric's introduced a Debt Discount initiative which provides various percentage discount options to enable customers pay off their outstanding bills and meet their financial obligations to the company.

The company uses a WhatsApp Chatbot for customer support service.

== Leadership ==
The current chief executive officer of Ikeja Electric is Ogochukwu Onyelucheya.

== See also ==
- ANDE
- GridBeyond
