= Natur-Energi =

Natur-Energi A/S
- Industry: Energy
- Founded: Copenhagen, Denmark (2007)
- Founder: Søren Hoelgaard Justesen
- Headquarters: Copenhagen, Denmark
- Area served: Denmark
- Key people: Rasmus Christensen (CEO); Signe Mandrup (Relations); Søren Hoelgaard Justesen (Chairman); Daniel Karpantschof (Dir. of B2C Sales); Tina Bech Andersen (Marketing Coordinator)
- Products: Renewable energy Others
- Services: Electricity from renewable sources; generated entirely from wind, hydro, sustainable biomass and solar power
- Number of employees: 8(2008)

Natur-Energi A/S is a Danish utility company which produce all of its electricity from renewable sources such as wind, hydro, sustainable biomass and solar power. The company delivers CO_{2} neutral electricity to households and companies. Natur-Energi was founded in 2008.

The main product is electricity endorsed and certified by the Swedish Society for Nature Conservation under the label Bra Miljöval. Bra Miljöval is approved by the Eugene Green Energy Standard

The company also offers verified carbon offset products to individuals and businesses.

== See also ==
- Ecotricity
- Good Energy
- Green Mountain Energy
