= Holland Board of Public Works =

Municipal utility

The Holland Board of Public Works is a municipal utility in Holland, Michigan. It provides electrical power, drinking water, and wastewater treatment. Its service area includes the city of Holland and parts of Park Township, Holland Charter Township, Fillmore Township and Laketown Township.

== Electrical generation ==
Electrical production began in 1893.

The current flagship plant, the Holland Energy Park, was completed in 2017. It utilizes Combined cycle natural gas power generation. The plant has also taken over operation of the city's extensive snowmelt system, pumping the water used to cool down equipment in the towers through pipes throughout the city to melt snow.

The former power plant, the James DeYoung, consisted of three active units. Units 3, 4 and 5 ranged in capacity from 11 to 29.5 megawatts. They had a combined capacity of 60 megawatts. Coal delivered by boat was the plant's fuel source. The plant was decommissioned in 2016 following the completion of the new Holland Energy Park.

A 22 megawatt oil burning unit was built on Sixth Street in 1973.

In 1992, two peaking units were installed in the southside industrial park. Located on M-40 near the headquarters of office furniture manufacturer Haworth, each provides 34 megawatts of power and can burn natural gas or fuel oil. A 74 megawatt unit installed in 2000 burns natural gas only.

The BPW also owns shares in Consumers Energy's JH Campbell Unit 3 and Detroit Edison's Belle River Power Plant; power generated at these two plants is used to supplement power produced at the BPW's own facilities.

== Water filtration ==
Water from Lake Michigan is filtered at a facility in Park Township on the city's northside. The plant has a capacity of 38.5 million gallons per day. 230 miles (370 km) of pipe provide water to the City of Holland and portions of three neighboring townships (Park, Laketown and Holland Charter). There are four storage tanks and five pumping stations within the system.

Expansion has been considered by building a new plant south of the city near Saugatuck Dunes State Park.

== Wastewater treatment ==
Wastewater is treated at a facility on Lake Macatawa near the BPW's James DeYoung power plant. The plant spans both sides of River Avenue. Over 180 miles (290 km) of pipe and 36 lift stations are used on pipes up to 36 inches (910 mm) in diameter. Wastewater is collected from the City of Holland and portions of neighboring townships (Park, Laketown, Fillmore and Holland Charter).
