= Kano Electricity Distribution Company =

Kano Electricity Distribution Company (KEDCO) is one of the eleven electricity distribution companies (DisCos) in Nigeria, responsible for distributing electricity across Kano, Katsina, and Jigawa states.

== History ==
KEDCO commenced operations in 2013 after the privatization of Nigeria's power sector. KEDCO's franchise area encompasses Kano, Katsina, and Jigawa states.

In June 2023, KEDCO reported that faults in the Shiroro-Kaduna 330KV Transmission lines led to reduced power allocation, causing supply shortages in its franchise areas. In October 2023, electricity workers shut down the company's operations over issues related to pension remittances. Union leaders accused KEDCO of victimizing representatives advocating for workers' rights.

KEDCO announced it lost over 6 billion Naira in a 12 day black out in November 2024. In December 2024, Jigawa State government acquired 10% stake at KEDCO for 1 billion Naira.

In April 2025, the company experienced a widespread power outage across its service areas due to ongoing network upgrades and vegetation control on its feeders.
