= SA Power Networks =

Privately-owned principal electricity distributor in South Australia

- Company type: Private
- Industry: Energy
- Predecessor: Electricity Trust of South Australia (ETSA)
- Founded: 1999
- Headquarters: Keswick, South Australia, Australia
- Area served: South Australia
- Key people: Peter Tulloch (chairman)
- Products: Electricity distribution
- Owner: Cheung Kong Infrastructure Holdings (51%); Spark Infrastructure (49%)
- Website: Official website

SA Power Networks is the principal electricity distributor in the state of South Australia, delivering electricity from high voltage transmission network connection points operated by ElectraNet. It is the successor to the Electricity Trust of South Australia.

== Ownership ==
SA Power Networks arose from the split up of the generation, transmission, distribution and retail responsibilities of the former SA Government-owned Electricity Trust of South Australia and its subsequent privatisation in 1999. The distribution business is owned by the Hong Kong–based Cheung Kong Infrastructure Holdings (51%), and Spark Infrastructure (49%). SA Power Networks is structured as a partnership of CKI Utilities Development Limited, PAI Utilities Development Limited, each incorporated in the Bahamas; and Spark Infrastructure SA (No. 1) Pty Ltd, Spark Infrastructure SA (No. 2) Pty Ltd, and Spark Infrastructure SA (No. 3) Pty Ltd, each incorporated in Australia.

== Regulated electricity distribution ==
SA Power Networks operates its electricity distribution business under a licence granted by the Government of South Australia.

The business is subject to regulation by the Australian Energy Regulator and Essential Services Commission of South Australia. Regulation of the business primarily relates to establishing service standards and setting the revenue required to meet those standards cost efficiently.

SA Power Networks is the fifth largest electricity distributor in the Australian National Electricity Market (NEM).

== See also ==
- Australian Energy Market Operator
- Electricity Trust of South Australia
- National Electricity Market
- Spark Infrastructure
