= Abuja Electricity Distribution Company =

Nigerian electrical company

Abuja Electricity Distribution Company (AEDC) is a Nigerian electrical company in charge of the distribution and sale of electricity across Federal Capital Territory, Niger State, Kogi State and Nassarawa State.

== History ==
Following the 2013 divestiture of the federal government from Power Holding Company of Nigeria, AEDC became one of the eleven separate companies or entities called Local Electric Distribution Companies or Local Distribution Companies (LDC) that was privatized and handed over to new investors on 1 November 2013. Each company became responsible for handling electricity distribution in each state or region. During this exercise, the Federal Government sold 60 percent shares of eleven distribution companies, including AEDC, to private investors. The core investor in AEDC was KANN Utility Company Limited, a joint venture between CEC Africa Investments Limited (CECA) and XerXes Global investment Limited (XerXes).

AEDC is also responsible for owning and maintaining the distribution network and supporting equipment. They also manage meter installations, carry out servicing, billing, co-ordinating consumer credit and revenue collection.

In September 2023, a power outage in its franchise area was attributed to a warning strike by the Nigeria Labour Congress (NLC). In July 2024, electricity workers under the Senior Staff Association of Electricity and Allied Companies (SSAEAC) and the National Union of Electricity Employees (NUEE) shut down AEDC's headquarters to protest alleged unresolved labour grievances, including unpaid pension arrears, poor staff welfare, and non-compliance with the minimum wage.
