= Ibadan Electricity Distribution Company =

Ibadan Electricity Distribution Company (IBEDC) is one of Nigeria's 11 electricity distribution companies (DisCos). IBEDC serves parts of southwestern Nigeria including Oyo, Ogun, Osun, and Kwara states.

== History ==
As part of the Electric Power Sector Reform Act of 2005, Nigeria's power sector underwent unbundling. Privatization led to the formation of IBEDC in November 2013, when operations formerly run by the Power Holding Company of Nigeria were licensed under private ownership.

In early 2022, Nigeria's Asset Management Corporation of Nigeria (AMCON) took control of Integrated Energy Distribution and Marketing (IBEDC's core investor) following loan default. In February 2023, the Federal High Court in Lagos placed an injunction on AMCON to prevent the sale or transfer of IBEDC assets while legal proceedings continued.

In early 2024, IBEDC reported 1,459 cases of energy theft ranging across meter bypass and tampering. In April 2024, heavy rains in Sango-Ota, Ogun State, led to the destruction of poles and power lines estimated at over ₦100 million.

In November 2024, IBEDC disconnected University College Hospital, Ibadan, citing outstanding debts of ₦400 million and this led to protests from patients. The hospital was reconnected in February 2025, after approximately 100 days offline, following interventions by the Minister of Power.
