= Transmission System Operator (Albania) =

Albanian electric power company

Operatori i Sistemit të Transmetimit
- Type: Electricity Transsmision Company
- Industry: Electricity generation, transmission, distribution
- Founded: 2004
- Headquarters: Tirana, Albania
- Key people: Skerdi Drenova (CEO)
- Services: Electric power transmission
- Owner: Government of Albania (100%)
- Number of employees: 735
- Website: www.ost.al

The transmission system of electricity in Albania is run by the Transmission System Operator (OST; Albanian: Operatori i Sistemit të Transmetimit), a public company with 100% state ownership. OST was created on 14 July 2004 as a result of the undergoing reforms within the Albanian Power Corporation. It was divided as a vertically organized company into three separate units with the functions of generating, transmitting and distributing of the electricity.
