= Nigerian Electricity Regulatory Commission =

Electricity regulatory body on Nigeria

Nigerian Electricity Regulatory Commission (NERC)

Agency overview
- Formed: 31 October 2005
- Preceding agency: Power Holding Company of Nigeria
- Type: Regulatory
- Jurisdiction: Federal Republic of Nigeria
- Headquarters: Abuja
- Agency executives: Musiliu O. Oseni, Ag. Chairman/CEO; Musiliu O. Oseni, Vice chairman/ Commissioner MCR; Yusuf O. Ali, Commissioner (Planning Research and Strategy)
- Parent agency: Federal Ministry of Power
- Website: www.nerc.gov.ng

Nigerian Electricity Regulatory Commission (NERC) is an independent regulatory body with authority for the regulation of the electric power industry in Nigeria. NERC was formed in 2005 under the Obasanjo administration’s economic reform agenda through the Electric Power Sector Reform Act, 2005 for formation and review of electricity tariffs, transparent policies regarding subsidies, promotion of policies that are efficient and environmentally friendly, and also including forming and enforcing of standards in the creation and use of electricity in Nigeria. NERC was instituted primarily to regulate the tariff of Power Generating companies owned or controlled by the government, and any other generating company which has a licence for power generation and transmission of energy, and distribution of electricity.

== History ==
Electric power generation in Nigeria began in 1896. In 1929, the Nigeria Electric Supply Company (NESCO) was established. In 1951, the Electric Corporation of Nigeria (ECN) was established to take over the assets of NESCO. In 1962, NDA (Nigeria Dams Authority) was established to develop the hydropower potentials in Nigeria. In 1972, ECN and NDA were merged to form NEPA (National Electric Power Authority), which later metamorphosed to Power Holding Company of Nigeria, as a holding company for its imminent unbundling and subsequent privatization. Previously, the Federal Ministry of Power oversees the electric power sector in Nigeria. It served both as the policy making body and the regulator; doing the latter mostly through the Electrical Inspectorate Services, a department in the Ministry. The electric power sector in Nigeria started with the Niger Dams Authority which controlled the Dams around Shiroro and River Niger. Due to abysmal power crises in the whole of Nigeria, the government of President Olusegun Obasanjo made efforts through the National Council for Privatisation/Bureau for Public Service (under the leadership of Nasir Ahmad el-Rufai to reform the sector which has seen no investment or major government attention since the 1980s. The NERC was formed through the EPSR Act of 2005 and it was inaugurated on 30 October 2007 with Ramsome Owan as its first Chairman/CEO. Dr. Ransome Owan, a US trained scientist who once worked for GE, was appointed for a five-year term as the executive Chairman of NERC. On his team included other Nigerians living in Diaspora who came in to work for NERC. NERC was given additional responsibilities for setting up and administering a fund called “Power Consumer Assistance Fund” which shall subsidize underprivileged power consumers in Nigeria. It also had the mandate to regulate the rural systems and determine the contribution rates to be sent to the Rural Electrification Fund.

== Powers and duties of NERC ==
The Commission's powers and duties are provided for in the EPSR Act 2005, and effectively ushered the privatization of electric power services in Nigeria, unbundling of the defunct National Electricity Power Authority (NEPA)/Power Holding Company of Nigeria (PHCN). NERC’s primary duty is protect the interests of consumers, issue licences to operators/investors, set and review electricity tariffs and where possible promote competition. The Commission's main objective is to protect existing and future consumers' interests in relation to electricity generated and that conveyed by distribution or transmission systems. Consumers' interests are their interests taken as a whole, including their interests in affordable tariffs and safe, reliable and available electricity supply, and the reduction of greenhouse gases to them.

== Structure of NERC ==
The Nigerian Electricity Regulatory Commission is governed by a tenured Board of Commissioners, headed by a Chairman. The current chairman is James Adeche Momoh, a Professor of Electrical Engineering with Howard University, USA was inaugurated Chairman/Chief Executive of the Nigerian Electricity Regulatory Commission (NERC) on May 3, 2018. This was sequel to the Senate confirmation of his nomination by President Muhammadu Buhari. The Nigerian President nominates one nominee Commissioner to represent his/her geopolitical zone in the country for a fixed tenure of 4 years, renewable once only. The Chairman/CEO, has a period of 5 years, also renewable once only. The nominees are duly screened by the Nigerian Senate.

The Board of Commission of NERC issues orders on electricity matters in Nigeria. It makes regulatory decisions and issues final licences to investors/operators. It also settles industrial disputes through its ADR mechanism in an open hearing.

NERC is divided into seven Divisions: Office of the Chairman/CEO, Engineering, Standards and Safety Division, Finance and Management Services Division, Government and Consumer Affairs Division, Legal Licensing and Enforcement Division, Market Competition and Rates Division, and the Renewable Energy/Research and Development Division.

== Reform of electricity sector in Nigeria ==
The Electric Power Sector Reform Act of 2005 established NERC's authority to impose mandatory reliability standards on the transmission system and to impose penalties on companies that manipulate the electricity markets. Since Independence from the UK, Nigeria has built 12 power plants. Nigeria produces as much electricity as North Dakota for 249 times more people, with blackouts 320 times per year per information from the World Bank. The EPSR Act of 2005 gave NERC additional responsibilities as outlined in NERC's Wide Important Goals. As part of that responsibility, NERC:

- Regulates the generation, transmission, distribution and marketing of electricity in Nigeria and with Nigeria;
- Licenses and inspects private and corporate electric power projects 10MW and above; where 1-10MW are issued Captive Licences;
- Ensures the reliability of generation plants, high voltage transmission system and the zonal distribution system;
- Ensures occupational health and safety of persons involved with electricity in the whole sector.
- Monitors and investigates energy markets;
- Uses civil penalties and other means against energy organizations and individuals who violate NERC rules in the energy markets;
- Administers accounting and financial reporting regulations and conduct of regulated companies.

In recent years, the NERC has been promoting the voluntary formation of Independent Electric Transmission Networks (IETNs) and Independent Electric Distribution Networks (IEDNs) to eliminate the potential for undue discrimination in access to the electric grid. However, since the generation capacity is low and the transmission not robust, NERC has developed regulations to push for the primary provision of supply, electric reliability and implementation of new regulations keeping in sight when the sector fully develops.

NERC regulates over 40 licensees in Nigeria. It is also responsible for permitting the construction of network of transmission lines by the Transmission Company of Nigeria, the transmission monopoly in Nigeria formed as a successor company of the PHCN. NERC works closely with the Nigerian Ministry of Environment and other related bodies in reviewing the safety, security and environmental impacts of proposed power plants and transmission networks.

In November 2013, Nigeria auctioned off 6 power plants, one belonging to Tony Elumelu, chairman of Heirs Holdings. Nigeria will need 170,000MW per day for its 174 million people. Transmission lines are outdated, ineffective, and power is stolen from electric poles, due to inadequate prepaid metering.

== Board of Commissioners ==
A new set of commissioners were sworn into office on February 7, 2017, filling a vacuum that had existed from December 2015 when the term of the last Board led by Mr. Sam Amadi expired. Sam Amadi served as Chairman/CEO of the Commission from December 18, 2010 to December 2015. During the 14 month vacuum, Anthony Akah acted as Chairman/CEO of the Commission. Sam Amadi is the publisher of "Privatization and public good: The rule of law challenge” and tried to reposition NERC after a two-year period of controversy, midwifed by the suspension and then removal of the first Board of Commissioners, led by Dr. Owan. Amadi and his team invited 'Distinguished Personalities' for Breakfast Series' lectures at the commission headquarters, including Nasir Ahmad el-Rufai and the former Corps Marshall of the Federal Road Safety Corps, Mr. Osita Chidoka.

The other Commissioners who served with Sam Amadi are:

- Mohammed Lawal Bello, Vice Chairman - In charge of the Renewable Energy/Research and Development Division
- Abba Ibrahim - Government and Consumer Affairs Division
- Patrick Umeh - Finance and Management Services Division
- Mary E. Awolokun- Engineering, Standards and Safety Division
- Steven Andzenge- Legal Licensing and Enforcement Division
- Eyo Ekpo- Market Competition and Rates Division

The new set of Commissioners who were sworn in on February 7, 2017 are:

- James Momoh - Chairman
- Sanusi Garba - Vice-Chairman
- Nathan Shatti - Finance and Management Services
- Moses Arigu - Consumer Affairs
- Dafe Akpeneye - Legal Licensing and Compliance
- Frank Okafor - Engineering Performance and Monitoring
- Musiliu Oseni - Planning Research and Strategy

MIT Professor, Akintunde Akinwande who was nominated to take charge as the Chairman/CEO however did not appear for the screening and was subsequently rejected. A new nominee, Prof. James Momoh, was forwarded to the Nigerian Senate for confirmation by President Muhammadu Buhari on April 20, 2017.

Reappointments of two commissioners, as of February 2, 2022, the Senate confirmed the reappointment of two commissioners and two newly added commissioners, the two reappointed commissioners are:

- Nathan Shatti - Finance and Management Services
- Dafe Akpeneye - Legal Licensing and Compliance

The two newly appointed commissioners will be taking the place of Moses Arigu - Consumer Affairs and Frank Okafor - Engineering Performance and Monitoring

They are :

- Dr. Yusuf Ali (North Central)- Consumer Affairs
- Chidi Ike (South East)-Engineering Performance and Monitoring

== See also ==
- Energy law
- High-voltage direct current
- Electric power industry
