= List of canals in Pakistan =

Pakistan has one of the largest man-made canal systems in the world, providing irrigation facilities to 48 million acres. The canal network of Pakistan consists of main canals, branch canals, link canals, major distributaries, minor distributaries, and watercourses or field channels.

Main canal: A principal channel off-taking directly from a river or reservoir which has discharge capacity of above 25 cubic meter/sec (cumecs) is called a main canal or main line. These canals are not used for direct irrigation. They drive water from the river/reservoir through a head regulator, and feed it to branch canals and major distributaries.

Branch canal: They take off water from the main canal and feed the major and minor distributaries. They are also not used for direct irrigation. Their discharge capacity usually ranges from 5-25 cubic meter/second.

Link canal: These canals are meant to transfer water of the three Western Rivers, namely Chenab, Jhelum and Indus, to the canals dependent on the three Eastern Rivers, namely Sutlej, Beas and Ravi.

Some of the notable canals of Pakistan are listed here.

== Canals in Punjab ==
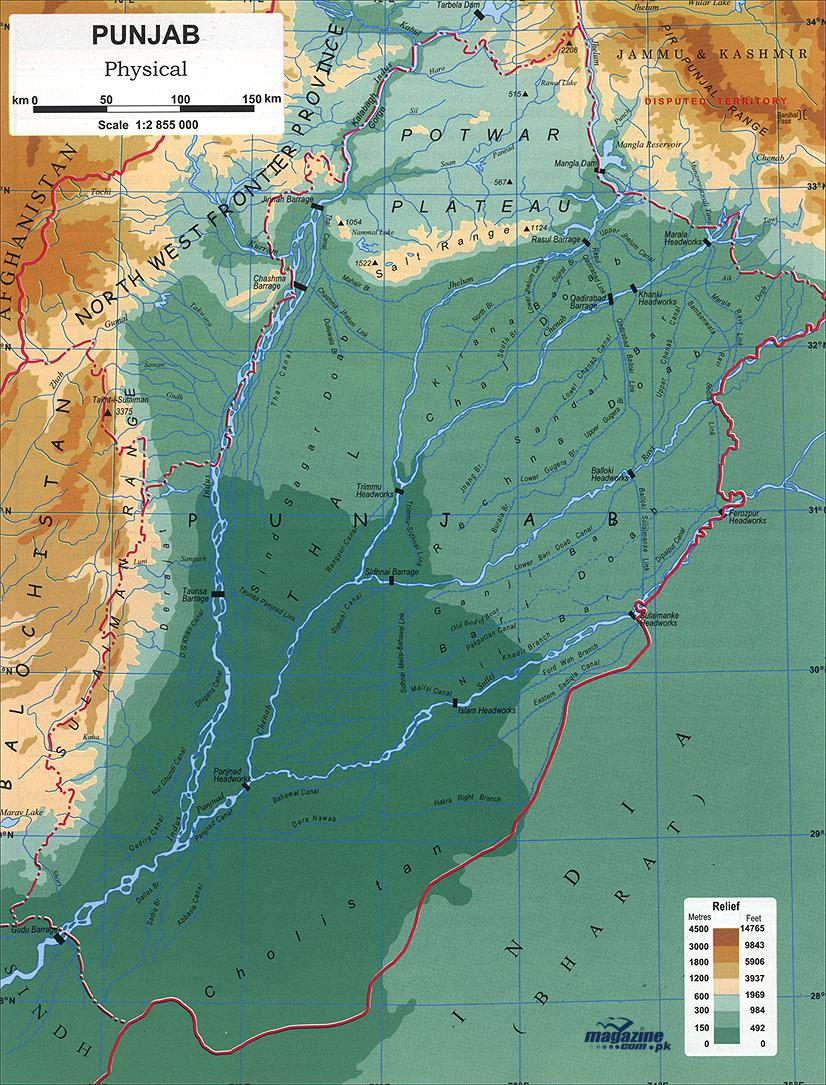
Physical map of Punjab

Name	Off-take point	River	Length (km)	Designed head discharge (cusecs)	Cultivable command area (acres)	Objectives	Completion year
Greater Thal Canal	Chashma Jhelum Link Canal	Indus	35	8,500	355,000	Irrigation of land in Khushab Bhakkar and Layyah districts of Punjab.	2009 (Phase I)
Chashma Jhelum Link Canal	Chashma Barrage	Indus		21,700	n/a	Diverts water from River Indus to River Jhelum to meet the requirement of the canals off-taking at Trimmu Barrage on river Jhelum.	1971
Chashma Right Bank Canal	Chashma Barrage	Indus	272	1,800	267,666	Irrigation of lands in Khyber Pakhtunkhwa and Punjab.	2003
Thal Canal Upper	Jinnah Barrage	Indus	50	9,000	2,115,931	Irrigation of Land in Khushab, Bhakkar and Mianwali districts of Punjab.	1948
Lower Bari Doab Canal	Balloki Headworks	Ravi	212	9,292	1,845,974	Irrigates land of Okara, Pakpattan, Sahiwal, and Khanewal districts.	1914
Balloki Sulemanki Link Canal	Balloki Barrage	Ravi	85	24,500	n/a	It originates from Balloki Barrage on River Ravi and connects with the River Sutlej at Sulemanki Barrage.	
Sidhnai Canal	Sidhnai Headworks	Ravi	50	4,005	831,369		
Sidhnai Mailsi Bahawal Link Canal	Sidhnai Headworks	Ravi	119	11,300	n/a	Feeds water of River Ravi to River Sutlej.	
Lower Bahawal Canal	Sidhnai Mailsi Bahawal Link Canal	Ravi	76	6,730	771,000		
Upper Depalpur Canal	BRBD Link Canal	Ravi	66	2,380	345,000		
Lower Depalpur Canal	Balloki Sulemanki Link Canal	Ravi	8	2,360	450,500		
Marala Ravi Link Canal	Marala Barrage	Chenab	101	22,000	154,987	Originates from Marala Barrage and transfers the water of Chenab to Ravi.	1956
Upper Chenab Canal	Marala Barrage	Chenab	42	16,850	1,210,700	Irrigates the lands of Gujranwala, Kamoke, Muridke and Sheikhupura.	1912
Lower Chenab Canal	Khanki Barrage	Chenab	64	8,143	3,400,000	Irrigation of land in Gujranwala, Hafizabad, Sheikhupura, Nanakana Sahib, Faisalabad, Jhang and Toba Tek Singh.	1898
Haveli Main Line	Trimmu Barrage	Chenab	69	7,375	1,024,000	Irrigates the lands of Jhang, Toba Tek Singh, Muzaffargarh, Khanewal, Multan.	
Rangpur Canal	Trimmu Barrage	Chenab	103	2,710	230,000	Irrigates the lands of Jhang, Muzaffargarh	
Trimmu Sidhnai Link Canal	Trimmu Barrage	Chenab	69	12,500	n/a	Transfers water from Trimmu Barage into the Ravi River.	
Qadirabad Balloki Link Canal	Qadirabad Barrage	Chenab	127	25,000	n/a	It is an extension of Rasul-Qadirabad Link Canal by which the water is transferred to the Ravi River.	
Punjnad Canal	Punjnad Barrage	Chenab	92	10,484	1,421,000		
Abbasia Link Canal	Punjnad Barrage	Chenab	76	5,600	n/a		
Abbasia Canal	Punjnad Barrage	Chenab	71	1,394	251,000		
Upper Jhelum Canal	Mangla Reservoir	Jhelum	142	8,975	535,000	Irrigates the plains of Gujrat and Mandi Bahauddin. It provides surplus water to the lower Chenab Canal.	1916
Lower Jhelum Canal	Rasul Barrage	Jhelum	63	5,280	1,453,000	Its command area includes the greater part of Chaj Doab – Sargodha, Mandi Bahauddin and Jhang districts in Punjab.	1904
Jalalpur Canal	Rasul Barrage	Jhelum	117		175,000	Irrigate the lands in Jhelum and Khushab districts.	2023
Rasul-Qadirabad Link Canal	Rasul Barrage	Jhelum	47	19,000	n/a	It carries water from Rasul Barrage on River Jhelum to the River Chenab.	
Bahawal Canal	Islam Barrage	Sutlej	16	2,740	52,023		
Fordwah Canal	Sulemanki Barrage	Sutlej	13	3,447	430,112		
Eastern Sadiqia Canal	Sulemanki Barrage	Sutlej	79	6,820	1,075,000	Irrigates the lands of Nili bar.	
Upper Pakpattan Canal	Sulemanki Barrage	Sutlej	182	5,508	961,158	Irrigates the lands of Okara, Pakpattan, Vehari, Lodhran.	
Lower Pakpattan Canal	Sidhnai Mailsi Bahawal Link Canal	Sutlej	214	1,160	308,568	Irrigates the lands of Vehari, Lodhran, Multan.	
Qaim Canal	Islam Headworks	Sutlej	11	483	52,797		
Kachhi Canal	Taunsa Barrage	Indus	399	6,000	72,000	Irrigation of lands in District Dera Bugti, Balochistan.	2017
DG Khan Canal	Taunsa Barrage	Indus	111	8,900	901,981		
Taunsa–Panjnad Link Canal	Taunsa Barrage	Indus	61	1,200	2,000,000	Carries water from Taunsa on the Indus River to Chenab River to feed the Punjab canals.	
Muzaffargarh Canal	Taunsa Barrage	Indus	119	8,901	838,380		

== Canals in Sindh ==
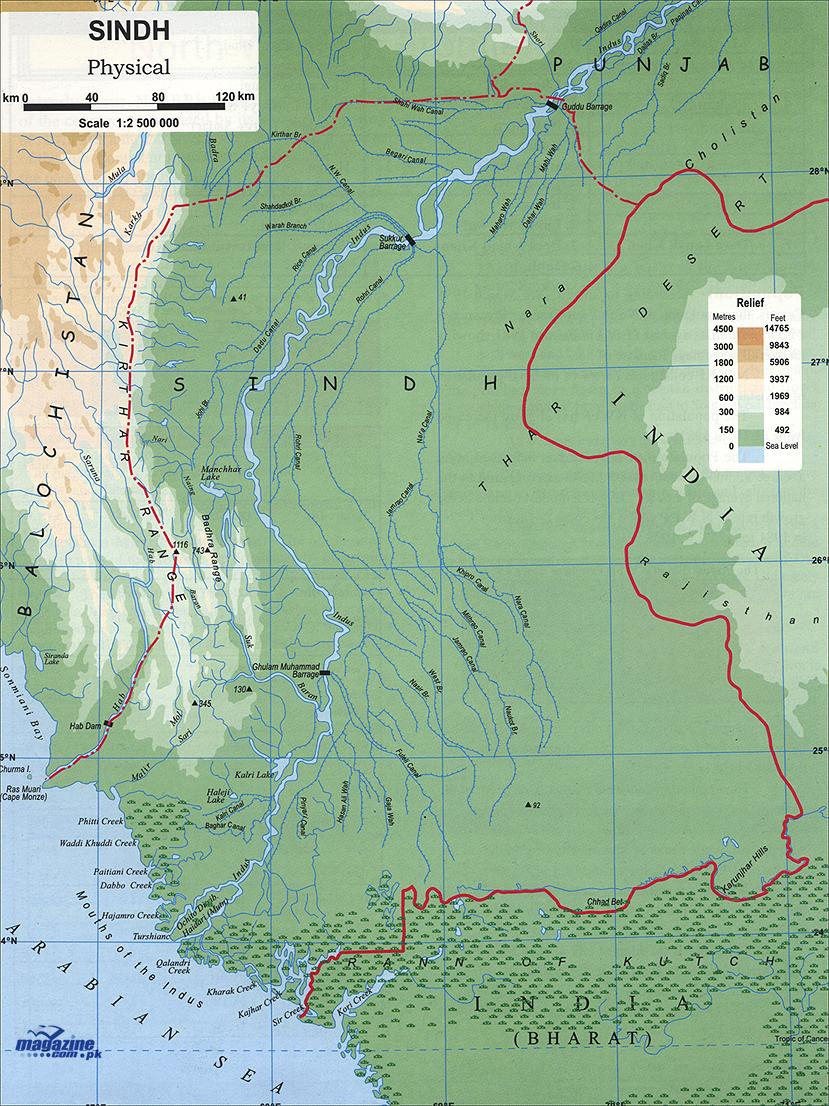
Physical map of Sindh

Name	Off-take point	River	Designed head discharge (cusecs)	Cultivable command area (acres)	Objectives	Completion year
Rainee Canal	Guddu Barrage	Indus	5,155	113,690	Irrigation of land in District Ghotki of Sindh.	2014
Ghotki Canal	Guddu Barrage	Indus	8,490			
Pat Feeder Canal	Guddu Barrage	Indus			Irrigate areas in the Nasirabad and Jafarabad districts of Balochistan.	1963
Desert Pat Feeder	Guddu Barrage	Indus	13,275		Irrigation of land in Naseerabad, Jaffarabad, Sohbatpur and Jhal Magsi.	
Begari Sindh Feeder	Guddu Barrage	Indus	14,764			
Nara Canal	Sukkur Barrage	Indus	13,649	2,300,000	It is the longest canal of Pakistan. This canal caters for an area of 2.3 million acres which is nearly equivalent to the entire Sindh area settled on Guddu Barrage alone.	1858
Rohri Canal	Sukkur Barrage	Indus	10,887	2,600,000	Cotton, wheat and sugar-cane are the main crops grown on this canal system.	
Nasrat Canal (Sada Wah)	Sukkur Barrage	Indus				
Khairpur East Canal	Sukkur Barrage	Indus	2,094			
Khairpur West Canal	Sukkur Barrage	Indus	1,940			
North Western Canal	Sukkur Barrage	Indus	5,152	965,000		
Rice Canal	Sukkur Barrage	Indus	10,658		It is a seasonal canal which flows only in kharif season and is designed for rice cultivation in Larkana and surrounding districts.	
Dadu Canal	Sukkur Barrage	Indus	3,150	1,300,000	It cultivates the fields of paddy, vegetable and cotton crops in Sindh.	
Fuleli Canal	Kotri Barrage	Indus	14,859			
Kalri Canal	Kotri Barrage	Indus	9,000			
Pinyari Canal	Kotri Barrage	Indus	13,636			
Akram Wah Canal	Kotri Barrage	Indus	4,100			
Karachi Canal	Sindh Barrage	Indus				
Thar Canal	Sindh Barrage	Indus				

== Canals in Khyber Pakhtunkhwa ==
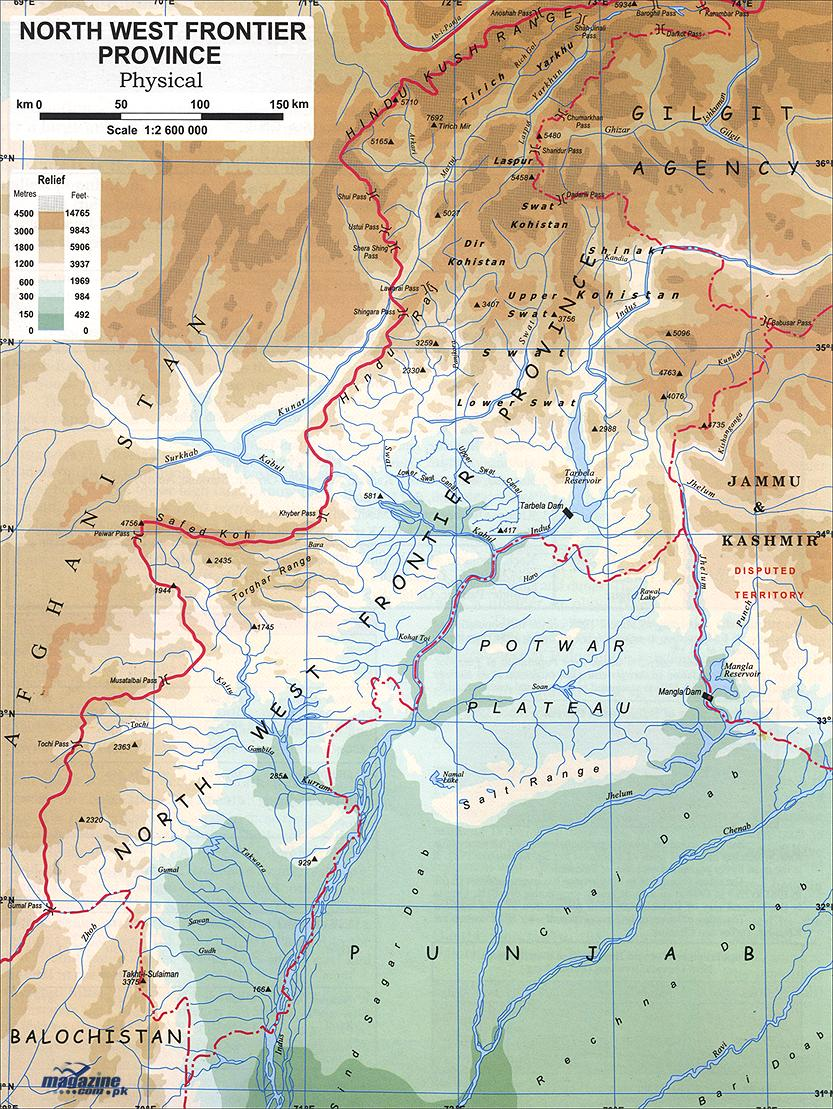
Physical map of FNWFP

Name	Off-take point	River	Designed head discharge (cusecs)	Cultivable command area (acres)
Upper Swat Canal	Amandara Headworks	Swat	3,600	281,000
Lower Swat Canal	Munda Headworks	Swat	1,940	134,500
Pehur Main Canal	Tarbela Reservoir	Indus	250	44,888
Pehur High Level Canal	Tarbela Reservoir	Indus	1000	10,531
Warsak Canal	Warsak Dam	Kabul	595	107,414
Kabul River Canal	Warsak Dam	Kabul	800	72,0020

== See also ==
- Punjab Canal Colonies
- Punjab Irrigation Department
- List of barrages and headworks in Pakistan
- List of rivers of Pakistan
- List of canals
