= List of barrages and headworks in Pakistan =

Siltation

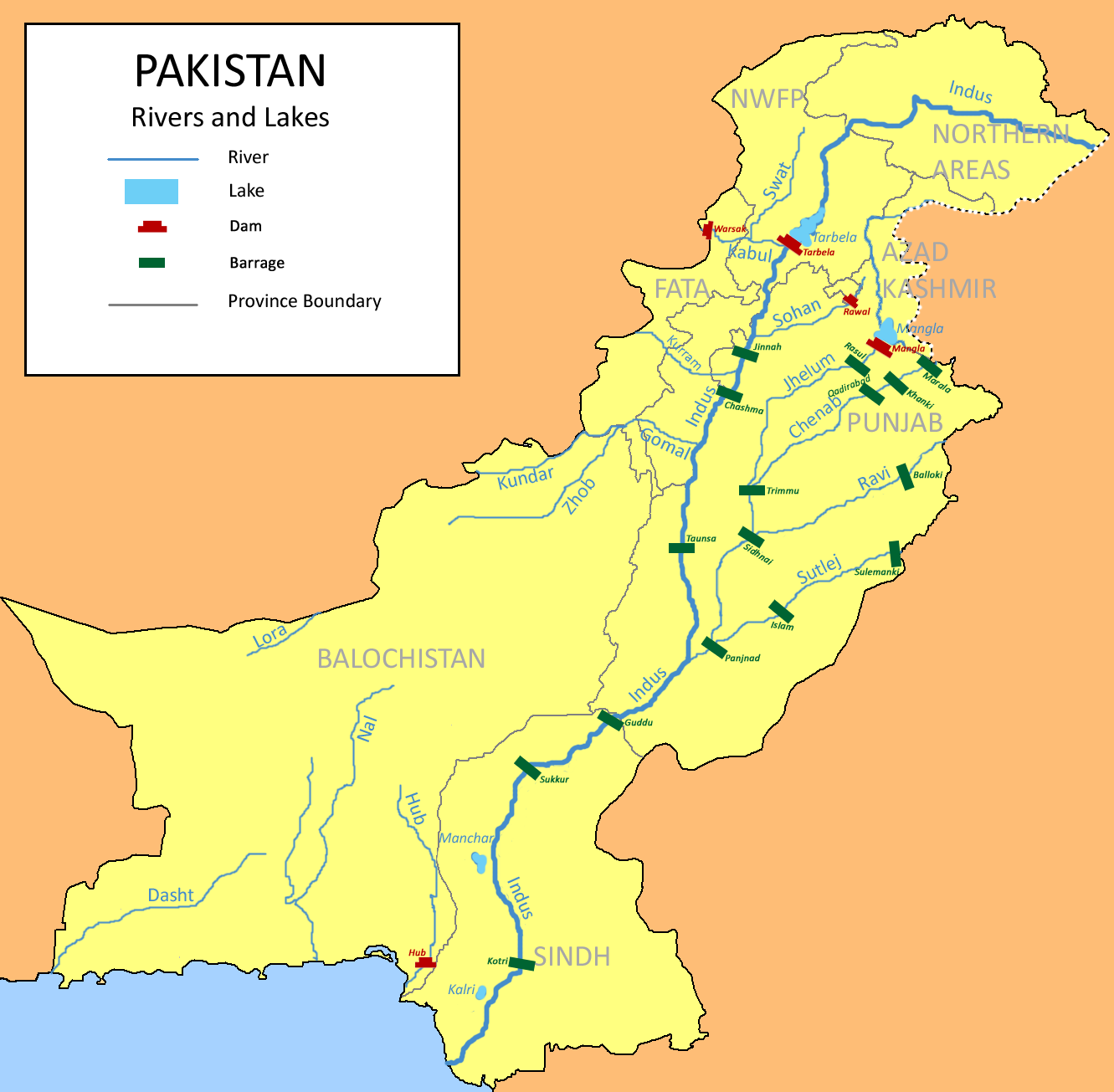
Map of the major rivers, lakes, dams, barrages and reservoirs in Pakistan

Barrages in Pakistan are used for irrigation which is the main purpose of these as they redirect water to places where they would usually not reach due to the natural flow of water to the lowest point.The second but also major effect is flood control.Flooding is very common and can be a large problem for cities due to poor Drainage infrastructure throughout Pakistan.These barrages encourage people to settle near once flooded areas due to less risk of floods destroying property,But due to Siltation the risk of flooding may appear again.Here is a list of barrages and headworks in Pakistan.

== Khyber Pakhtunkhwa ==
=== Headworks ===
Picture	Name	River	Year completed	Ref.
	Munda Headworks	Swat	1931	

== Punjab ==
=== Headworks ===
Picture	Name	River	Year completed	Ref.
	Khanki Headworks	Chenab	1892 2017 (replaced by the New Khanki Barrage)	
	Marala Headworks	Chenab	1912 (as Marala weir) 1968 (replaced by Marala Barrage)	
	Balloki Headworks	Ravi	1915 1966 (remodeling)	
	Islam Headworks	Sutlej	1927	
	Sulemanki Headworks	Sutlej	1927	
	Panjnad Headworks	Chenab	1932	
	Sidhnai Headworks	Ravi	1965	
	Qadirabad Headworks	Chenab	1967	
	Mohammadwala Headworks	Chenab		

=== Barrages ===
Picture	Name	River	Year completed	Ref.
	Trimmu Barrage	Chenab	1939	
	Jinnah Barrage	Indus	1946	
	Tonsa Barrage	Indus	1958	
	Rasul Barrage	Jhelum	1968	
	Chashma Barrage	Indus	1971	
	Ghazi Brotha Barrage	Indus	2004	

== Sindh ==
=== Barrages ===
Picture	Name	River	Year completed	Ref.
	Sukkur Barrage	Indus	1932	
	Kotri Barrage	Indus	1955	
	Guddu Barrage	Indus	1962	
	Sindh Barrage	Indus	Proposed	
	Sehwan Barrage	Indus	Proposed	

== See also ==
- List of dams and reservoirs in Pakistan
- List of canals in Pakistan
