= Marala Headworks =

Barrage in Punjab, Pakistan

- مرالہ ہیڈ ورکس
- A view of Marala Headworks
- 32°40′24″N 74°27′50″E
- Waterway: Chenab River
- Country: Pakistan
- County: Marala, Sialkot District
- Maintained by: Punjab Irrigation Department
- Operation: Hydraulic
- First built: 1912
- Latest built: 1968
- Length: 500,000 feet (150 km)
- Fall: 15 feet (4.6 m)
- Above sea level: 820 feet (250 m)
- Discharge capacity Up to 1.1 million cusec

Marala Headworks is a headworks situated on the Chenab River near the city of Sialkot in Sialkot district in Punjab, Pakistan. A weir was first built during 1906–1912 in the British India to feed the Upper Chenab Canal, as part of the 'Triple Canals Project'. A new Marala Barrage was constructed in 1968 to feed the Marala–Ravi Link Canal in addition to the original Upper Chenab Canal.

== History ==
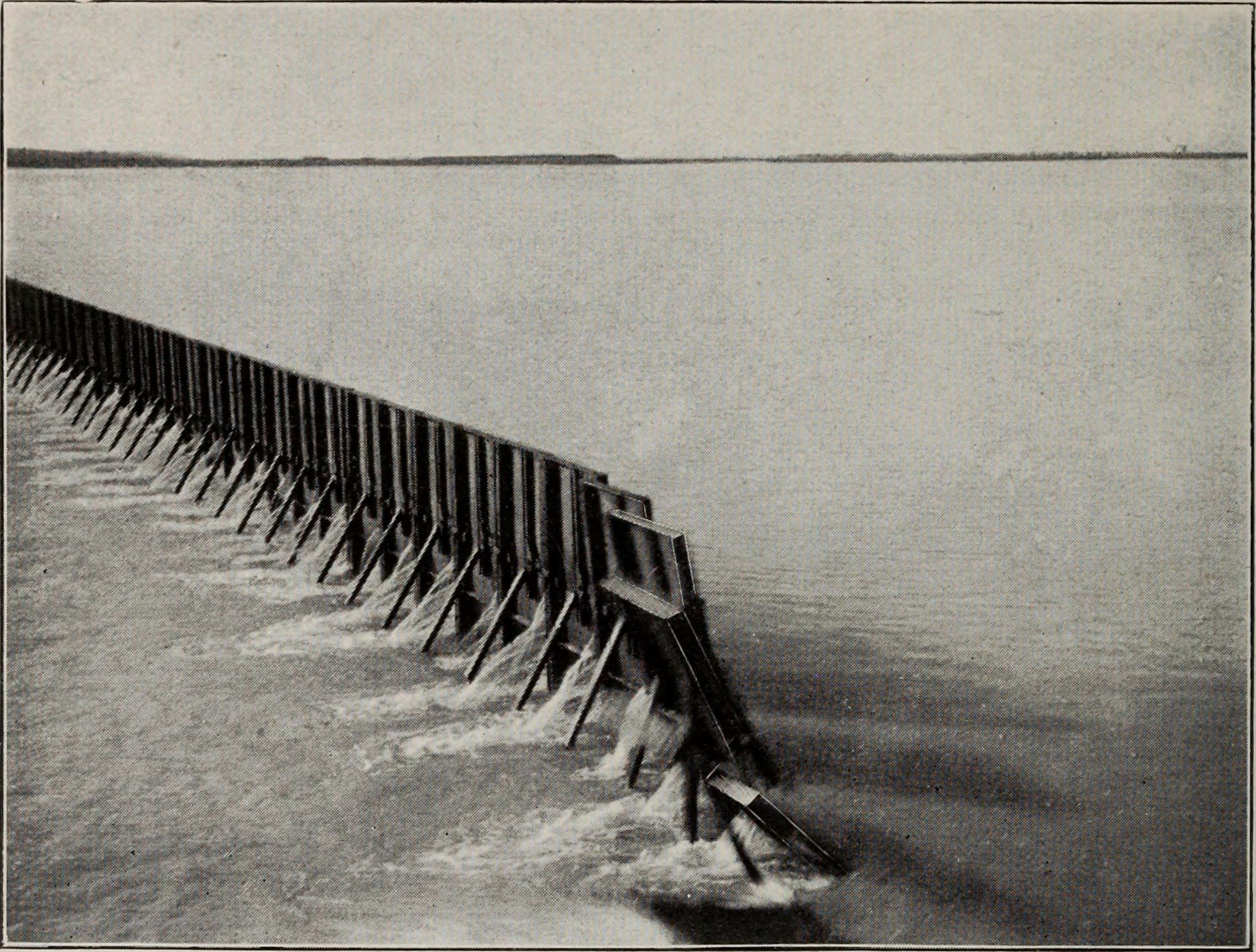
Marala headworks in 1915

Marala Headworks

The original headworks near Marala along with the Upper Chenab Canal were built as part of the Triple Canals Project of the British India during 1906–1912. The canal was meant to irrigate an area of 648,000 acres in the Gujranwala District as well as to transfer waters to the Ravi River near Balloki. It was opened in 1912 and fully completed by 1917 at a cost of 37 million PKR. It became profitable in 1938–39.

The waters transferred to the Ravi River were further fed to the Lower Bari Doab Canal via the Balloki Headworks, irrigating the Montgomery and Multan districts. This canal became profitable at least a decade earlier than the Upper Chenab Canal. The waters of the Ravi River itself were left to irrigate the semi-arid states of Bikaner and Bahawalpur. The link canal concept initiated in the Triple Canals Project eventually became the basis for the Indus Waters Treaty after the independence of India and Pakistan.

The Marala–Ravi Link Canal was constructed between 1952 and 1956 in the wake of the Indo-Pakistani water dispute of 1948, when Pakistan became apprehensive of water security in the Ravi and the Sutlej rivers. This canal transfers 623 cusecs of water to the Ravi River in order to satisfy the requirements of Balloki and Sulemanki headworks.

== Characteristics ==
Marala Headworks is a large hydro engineering project and is used to control water flow and flood control in the River Chenab.

== Geography ==
The Chenab River is a 1,086-kilometre (675 mi) long river which originates from Chandra Taal in the Lahul & Spiti District of Himachal Pradesh in India where it is known as the Chenab River after the two tributaries. Chandra and Bhaga, join at Tandi in the Lahul & Spiti district and acquires the name Chenab when it enters Jammu and Kashmir, near Kishtwar in India. After cutting across the Pir Panjal Range, it enters the Sialkot District in the Pakistan. Here the Marala Barrage was built across the river in 1968 with a maximum discharge of 31,000 m^{3}/s. Two major water channels originate at the Marala headworks—the Marala-Ravi Link Canal and the Upper Chenab Canal. Proposals are under consideration to build Mangla Marala Link Canal to overcome any shortage of water in future.

Marala Headworks is also a picnic spot, a wildlife sanctuary and an unprotected wetland.

Marala Headworks and picnic area

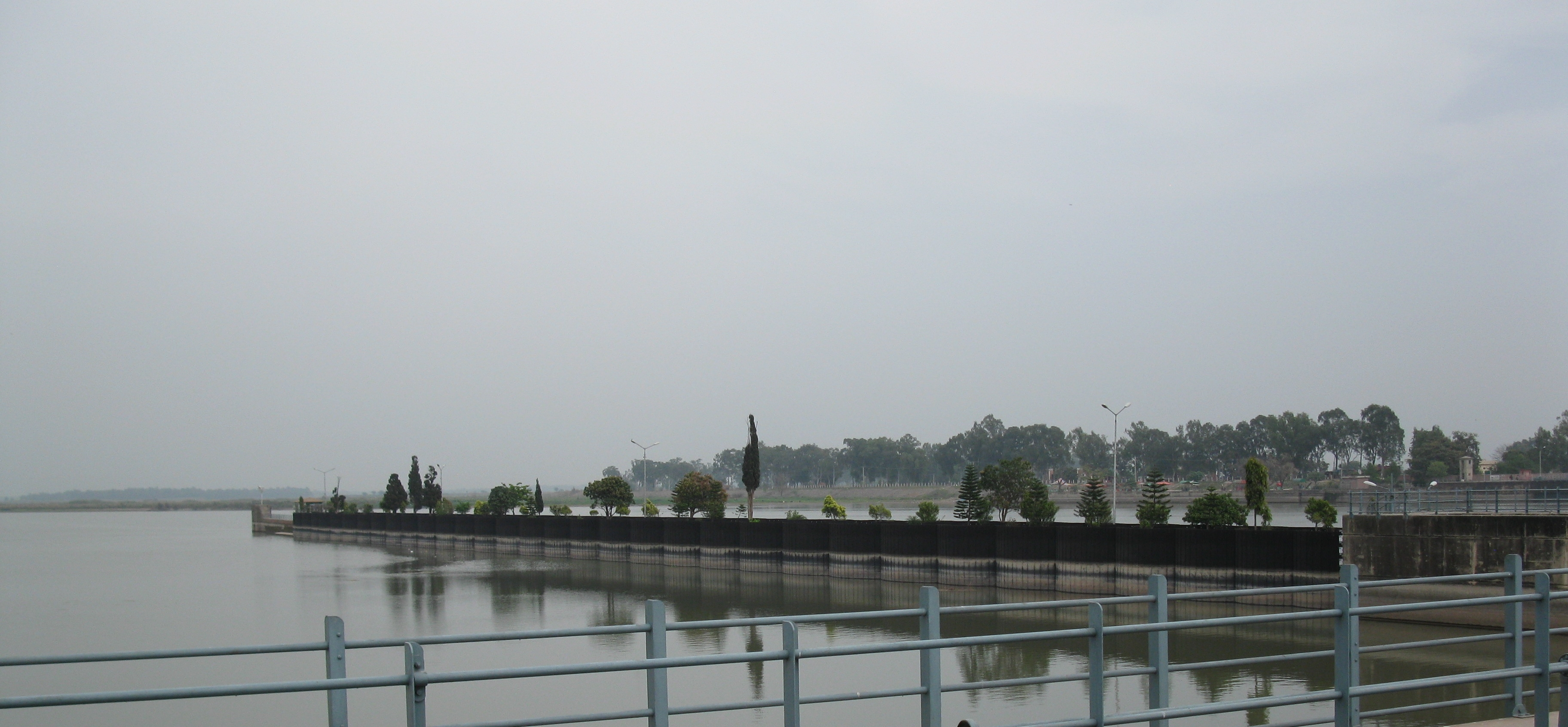

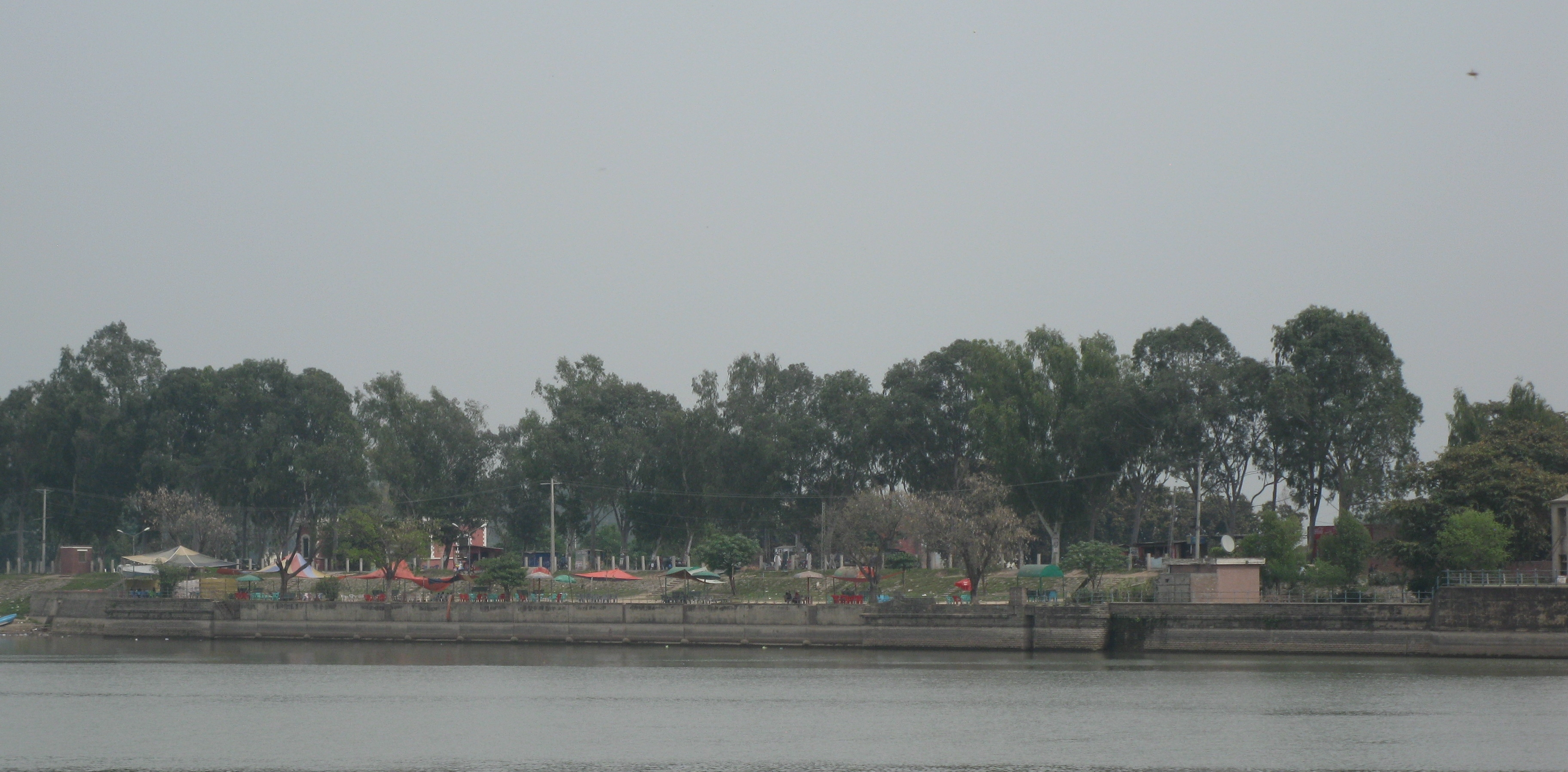

== See also ==
- Chenab river dams and hydroelectric projects
- List of barrages and headworks in Pakistan
- List of dams and reservoirs in Pakistan
- Punjab Irrigation Department

== Bibliography ==
- Chaturvedi, Mahesh Chandra (2011), India's Waters: Environment, Economy, and Development, CRC Press, ISBN 978-1-4398-7283-3
- Gilmartin, David (2020), Blood and Water: The Indus River Basin in Modern History, Univ of California Press, ISBN 978-0-520-35553-8
- Headrick, Daniel R. (1988), The Tentacles of Progress: Technology Transfer in the Age of Imperialism, 1850-1940, Oxford University Press, ISBN 978-0-19-802178-0
- Naqvi, Saiyid Ali (2012), Indus Waters and Social Change: The Evolution and Transition of Agrarian Society in Pakistan, Oxford University Press Pakistan, ISBN 978-0-19-906396-3
- Singh, N. T. (2005), Irrigation and Soil Salinity in the Indian Subcontinent: Past and Present, Lehigh University Press, ISBN 978-0-934223-78-2
