= Indus Basin Replacement Works =

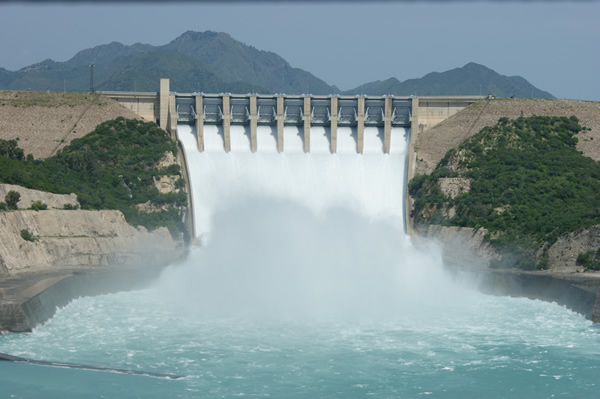
Tarbela Dam in KPK Province, Pakistan

The Indus Basin Replacement Works, also known as the Indus Basin Settlement Plan, was carried out in Pakistan's Indus Basin Irrigation System, which is one of the world's largest continuous irrigation systems. The replacement works were implemented to provide Pakistan with enough water for irrigation needs following the Indus Waters Treaty between India and Pakistan. The treaty gave the rights to three eastern rivers of the Indus Basin to India, and to make up for this loss of water a network of dams and link canals was built to haul water from the western Indus tributaries Jhelum and Chenab to the eastern Ravi, Sutlej and Beas rivers. The government of Pakistan built the Tarbela Dam and Mangla Dam and a number of barrages now managed by Punjab Irrigation Department under the Indus Basin Replacement Works. Eight inter-river canals were also built between western and eastern rivers. It is due to the connectivity between these rivers that Pakistan's irrigation system is called a contiguous irrigation system.

== See also ==
- Chenab dams and hydroelectric projects
- Rivers of Jammu and Kashmir
