= Chak Shafi Khurd =

Village in Punjab, Pakistan

- Village
- Country: Pakistan
- Province: Punjab
- Division: Sahiwal
- District: Pakpattan
- Tehsil: Arifwala

Population
  - Total: 1,785
- Time zone: UTC+5 (PST)

Chak Shafi Khurd is a village in Arif Wala Tehsil of Pakpattan District, in the Punjab province of Pakistan. The village lies on the Delhi–Multan roadnear the Pakpattan Canal.

== Economy ==
The local economy is predominantly agricultural, with wheat, maize, sugarcane, cotton and rice among the principal crops cultivated in the area.

== Demographics ==
The village had a reported population of 1,785, all of whom were recorded as Muslim.
