= Rasul Barrage =

Barrage in Punjab, Pakistan

Rasool Barrage
- رسول بیراج
- Interactive map of Rasool Barrage
- 32°40′49″N 73°31′15″E
- Waterway: Jhelum River
- Country: Pakistan
- State: Punjab
- Maintained by: Punjab Irrigation Department
- Operation: Hydraulic
- First built: 1968
- Length: 975 meters (3,201 ft)
- Width: 17 meters (56 ft)
- Fall: 6 meters (20 ft)
- Above sea level: 250 meters (820 ft)

Rasul Barrage is a barrage on the River Jehlum between Jhelum District and Mandi Bahauddin District of the Punjab province of Pakistan. It is situated 72 km downstream of Mangla Dam.

== The most famous new and old barrage ==
The current structure of the barrage was constructed in 1968 and the old barrage (built by the British) has been dismantled. The Punjab Irrigation Department's Sargodha Zone is responsible for the operation of this barrage. Rasul Barrage is used to control water flow in the River Jhelum for irrigation and flood control purposes.

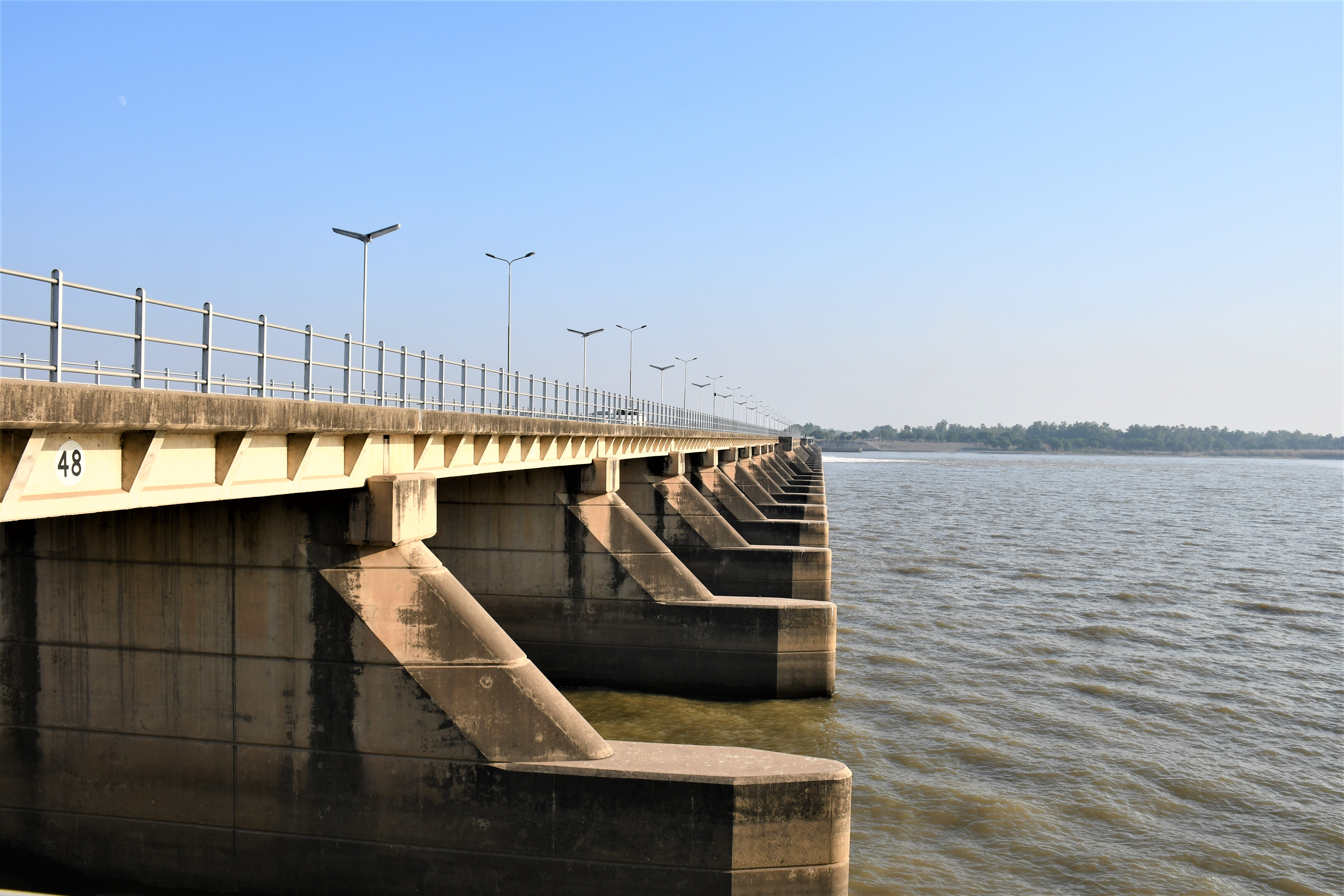
Rasul Barrage at River Jhelum

Rasul Barrage has a discharge capacity of 24070 cubic meter per second. Water is diverted from this point to Chenab River at Qadirabad through Rasul-Qadirabad link canal, then ultimately transferred to Sulemanki Barrage on the Sutlej River. Rasul-Qadirabad link canal has the second largest water discharge capacity after Chashma Jhelum Link Canal. It has 538-m³/s discharge capacity while Chashma Jhelum Link Canal has 615-m³/s capacity. Lower Jhelum Canal, with a discharge capacity of 5280 cusecs also emanates from river Jhelum at this barrage.

This canal has culturable command area of 1.45 million acres and irrigates the districts of Mandi Bahauddin and Sargodha.

== Rasul Hydel Power Station ==
Rasul Hydel Power Station

Power generation
- Nameplate capacity: 22 MW
- Annual net output: 32.8 GW·h

External links
- Commons: Related media on Commons

A small hydropower plant of 22 MW (two units of 11 MW each) generation capacity was also put into operation on Upper Jhelum Canal at Rasul, Punjab in December 1952 with the average annual yield of 63 GWh.

== See also ==
- List of barrages and headworks in Pakistan
- List of dams and reservoirs in Pakistan
- List of power stations in Pakistan
- Punjab Irrigation Department
