= Jalalpur Canal =

Canal project on the Jhelum River in Punjab, Pakistan

- Location: Pind Dadan Khan Tehsil, Jhelum District; Khushab District

Jalalpur Canal (Urdu: جلال پور نہر) is a canal located in the northern bank of the Jhelum River from Rasul Barrage / Rasul Headworks up until Khushab. It will also irrigate the uncultivated lands of Pind Dadan Khan.

== Project ==
The command area of JIP is in form of a long strip of land bounded by the salt range hills on northern side and Jhelum River (right bank) on southern side.

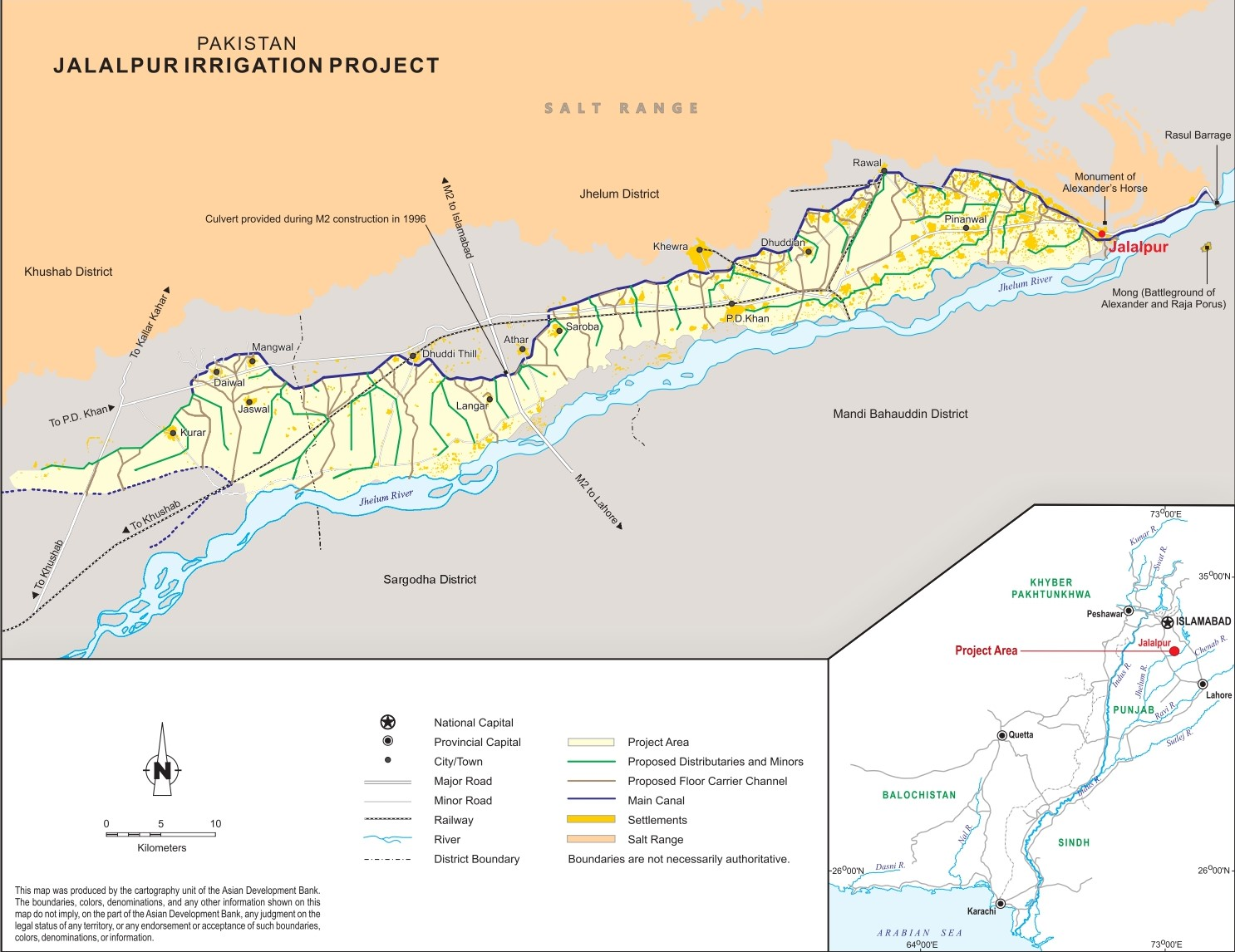
Area map of the proposed Jalalpur Irrigation Canal Project

It would consists of:

- 117 km long main canal with 23 distributaries & 10 minor canals of 93 km (total 210 km)
- Irrigating 170,000 hectares of land
- Construction & fixing of 485 ravines
- 10000 acre of Land levelling
- 72 modern irrigation systems on 2000 Acre land
- 18 flood infrastructures
- 20 water storage ponds & solar pumping stations
- 17 drinking water outlets in 26 localities
- Drip irrigation system on 1941 acres

There are about 59 hill torrents (locally known as Nadi ندی or Rodh Kohi رود کوہی), flowing across the JIP and ultimately falling into Jhelum River. The climate in the project area is hot and arid.

- Summer (May-Aug): 18°C to 46°C
- winter (Nov-Feb): 0°C to 24°C).

The rainfall is low and erratic. The pan evaporation is 3 times of average yearly rainfall, requiring irrigation essential for crop production.

88% of the project will be funded by the Asian Development Bank (ADB) and the rest 12% by the Govt of Punjab (combinedly managed by Punjab Irrigation Department & Agriculture Department محکمہ زراعت).

== History ==
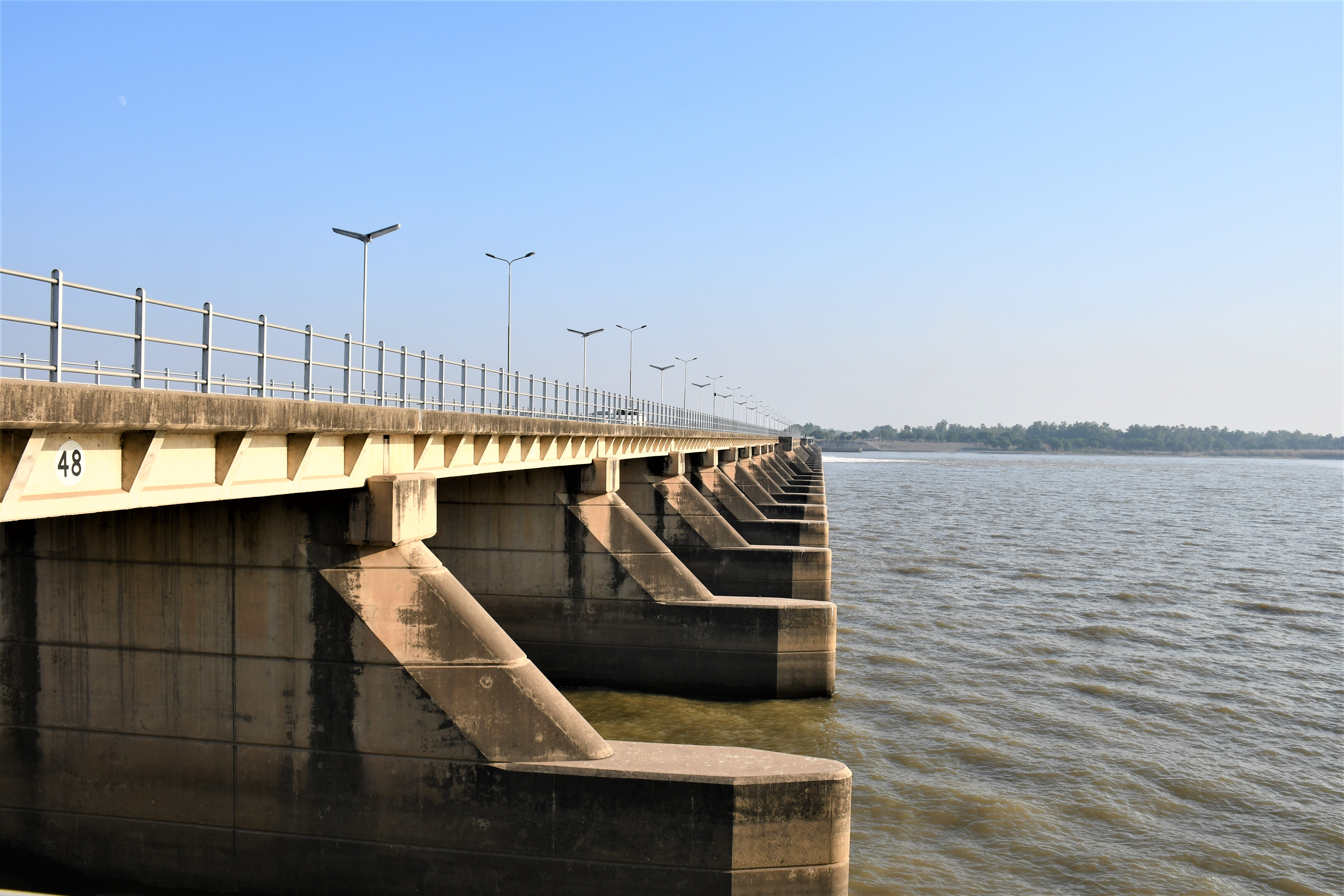
Jalalpur Canal will off take from Rasul Barrage at River Jhelum

In British Raj during the construction of Rasul Barrage (1898-1901), a northern dividing-wall was built for this upcoming project.

This project was also provisioned during the rebuild of Rasul Barrage (under Indus Water Treaty) in 1967.

The feasibility studies of the project exist from 1992-93 which was updated in 2010. Another study was done from Mar 2014 - Nov 2015.

In 1995 (approx) during the M-2 Motorway construction near Lillah Interchange, a passageway towards Lahore was created for the proposed canal.

Earliest document date mentioned on Asian Development Bank (ADB) website is July 2013 in the Project Data Sheet section.

Topographic survey was carried out in 2016.

Recent ground-breaking was done on 26 Dec 2019 by the Prime Minister
