= Sindh Barrage =

Pakistani dam project

- Location within Pakistan
- Location: Sindh, Pakistan
- Coordinates: 24°06′11″N 67°39′24″E
- Construction began: January 2022
- Opening date: January 2025
- Construction cost: USD 750 million
- Owner: Government of Pakistan
- Operator: Water and Power Development Authority (WAPDA)

Dam and spillways
- Impounds: Indus River
- Height: 39.37 ft (12.00 m)
- Length: 2,000 ft (610 m)

Reservoir
- Total capacity: 2,500,000 acre⋅ft (3.1 km^{3})
- Catchment area: 55000 acres

Sindh Barrage is a proposed project in Sindh, Pakistan that will be constructed on the River Indus in between the Kotri Barrage and the Indus River outfall into the Arabian Sea.

The proposed barrage site is located approximately 30 kilometers upstream from the Indus River's outfall into the Arabian Sea, 10 kilometres east of Baghan village, 75 kilometres south of Thatta, and 105 kilometres east of Karachi. The plan involves constructing a 12-meter-high barrage with dykes on both banks in the floodplain, ranging from 4 to 9 meters in height. The reservoir created will extend 160 kilometres upstream, designed to prevent seawater intrusion into the Indus River.

Two Canals will be built on each side of the barrage to provide irrigation and drinking water. One will be the Karachi Canal, extending to the coastal area up to Dhabeji, and the other will be the Thar Canal, serving Tharparkar. The project study was set to be completed by September 2021, with construction expected to begin in January 2022 and finish by December 2024, at an estimated cost of 125 billion Pakistani Rupees (approximately US$750 million).

This barrage is expected to irrigate around 55,000 acres of land lost to desertification and soil salinity. Additionally, it will help restore agricultural productivity and support the recovery of maritime flora and fauna in the region.

== See also ==
- List of barrages and headworks in Pakistan
- List of dams and reservoirs in Pakistan
- List of power stations in Pakistan
