= Rainee Canal Project =

Canal in Pakistan

Rainee Canal Project is located in Ghotki, Sukkur and Khairpur Districts of Sindh Province in Pakistan. It is a canal that starts from the left bank of the Indus River at Guddu Barrage. The total length of the main canal is about 175 km and length of its distributaries will be around 686 km.

== Construction ==
The project commenced in October 2002. Construction started in two phases. Work on Phase 1 was completed in June 2014 while Phase 2 is scheduled to be completed in June 2018.

== Benefits ==
The canal will provide water for irrigation of 412,400 acres of land and will ensure supply of water to surrounding areas.
