= Islam Headworks =

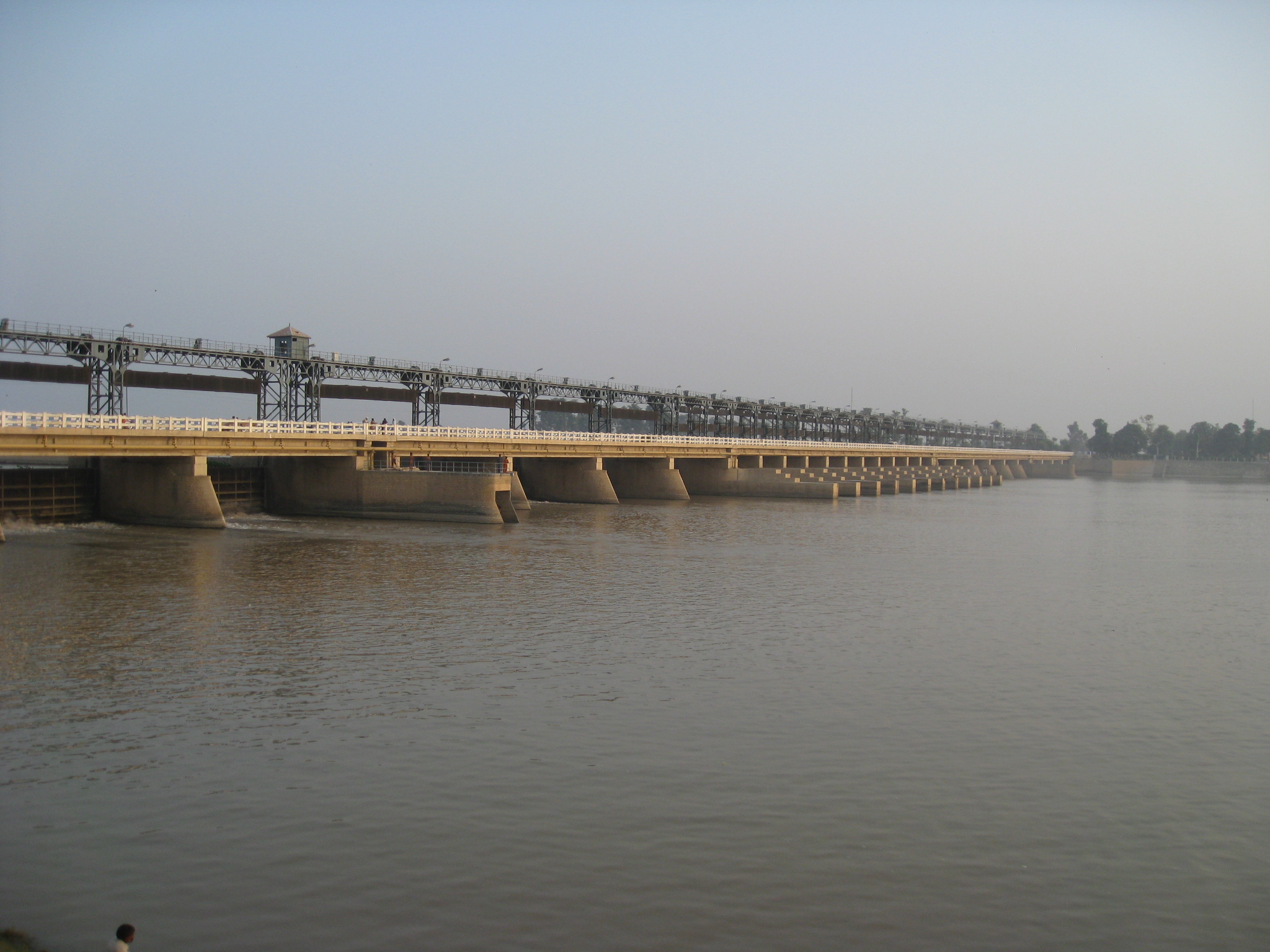
- Interactive map of Islam Headworks
- Official name: Islam Headworks
- Country: Pakistan
- Location: Hasilpur Tehsil, Bahawalpur District
- Coordinates: 29°49′35″N 72°32′57″E
- Purpose: Irrigation, flood control
- Construction began: 1922
- Opening date: 1927
- Operator: Punjab Irrigation Department

Dam and spillways
- Impounds: Sutlej River

The Islam Headworks, commonly known as Head Islam, is a headworks on the River Sutlej in Hasilpur Tehsil (Bahawalpur District) of the Punjab province of Pakistan. It is used for irrigation and flood control.

The barrage is about 15 kilometres (9.3 mi) north of Hasilpur city and about 7.5 kilometres (4.7 mi) south of Luddan on the Vehari-Hasilpur road. It was completed in 1927 as the Sutlej Valley Project for irrigation of Neeli Bar. At 503 metres (1,650 ft) long with a design discharge of 8,500 cubic metres per second (300,000 cu ft/s), it has two off taking larger canals which irrigate 278,800 hectares (689,000 acres) of land in Southern Punjab and 283,300 hectares (700,000 acres) in the former Bahawalpur state. Mailsi Canal (150 m^{3}/s) arises from its right bank and Bahawal Canal (150 m^{3}/s) from the left; a third, smaller canal called Qaim Canal (15.8 m^{3}/s) also arises from the left bank.

== Maintenance and environmental concerns ==
Islam Headworks is reportedly in distress owing to aging, design deficiencies, constructional defects, hydraulic and mechanical problems, inadequate operation, maintenance, and drastic changes in river morphology as a result of the implementation of the Indus Water Treaty of 1960. The most significant problem has been the barrage's inadequate flood passage capacity compared to flood intensities developed over a 100-year return period. The aging process along with inadequate or deferred maintenance has contributed to a general deterioration of different components of the structure. The poor structural state of the headworks was documented to be poor in June 1998 due to inattention, lack of interest, and unreliable operations of the headworks. Every September when the flood level rises and India releases a large amount of water, it creates havoc in areas downstream from the headworks.

A feasibility study and detailed designs were prepared in 2008 to rehabilitate the headworks. However, due to a lack of interest, inefficiency at the government level, and an absence of confidence and trust in International Financial Institutions (IFIs), the rehabilitation was postponed. The World Bank (WB) has given verbal assurance for financing the rehabilitation of the Islam Headworks but it would be only after rehabilitation of another barrage (Jinnah). More recently, the Punjab government has obtained assurances from the World Bank and the provincial government of Shahbaz Sharif has begun to take interest in rehabilitation of the headworks. Flooding caused significant damage throughout Punjab in 2013, which may have been an impetus for this more proactive policy.

According to a 2011 report, the River Sutlej at this point is the most polluted river in South Asia. The combined unregulated discharge of urban and industrial waste into the river during its course through India and later Pakistan is the most likely source of this problem.

The Islam Barrage is a tourist site for those who want to visit nearby restaurants that sell fresh fish. Most of the tourists are from nearby towns. However, it can be developed into an ecotourism site for those who are interested in the hydrology of the Indus basin and the effect of shortages of water in this part of the world. The desertification of the area from the nearby Choolistan desert is an interesting phenomenon and the pollution of the river from upstream industry in India is a cause of concern.

== See also ==
- List of barrages and headworks in Pakistan
- List of dams and reservoirs in Pakistan
- Dams on Sutlej
- Rivers of Jammu and Kashmir
