= Athara Hazari =

Town in Punjab, Pakistan

اٹھارہ ہزاری
- City
- Athara Hazari
- Location within Pakistan
- Coordinates: 31.1670716°N 72.0898192°E
- Country: Pakistan
- Province: Punjab
- District: Jhang District
- Tehsil: Athara Hazari

Population (2023)
  - Total: 30,137
- Time zone: UTC+5 (PST)

Athara Hazari (Urdu: اٹهاره ہزارى), is a city and capital of Athara Hazari Tehsil in Jhang District, Punjab, Pakistan. It is located on the Jhang-Bhakkar Highway.

It is about 7 kilometers from Trimmu Barrage. To the north of the town, the rivers Jhelum and Chenab meet before flowing into Trimmu Barrage.
