= Chashma Right Bank Irrigation Project =

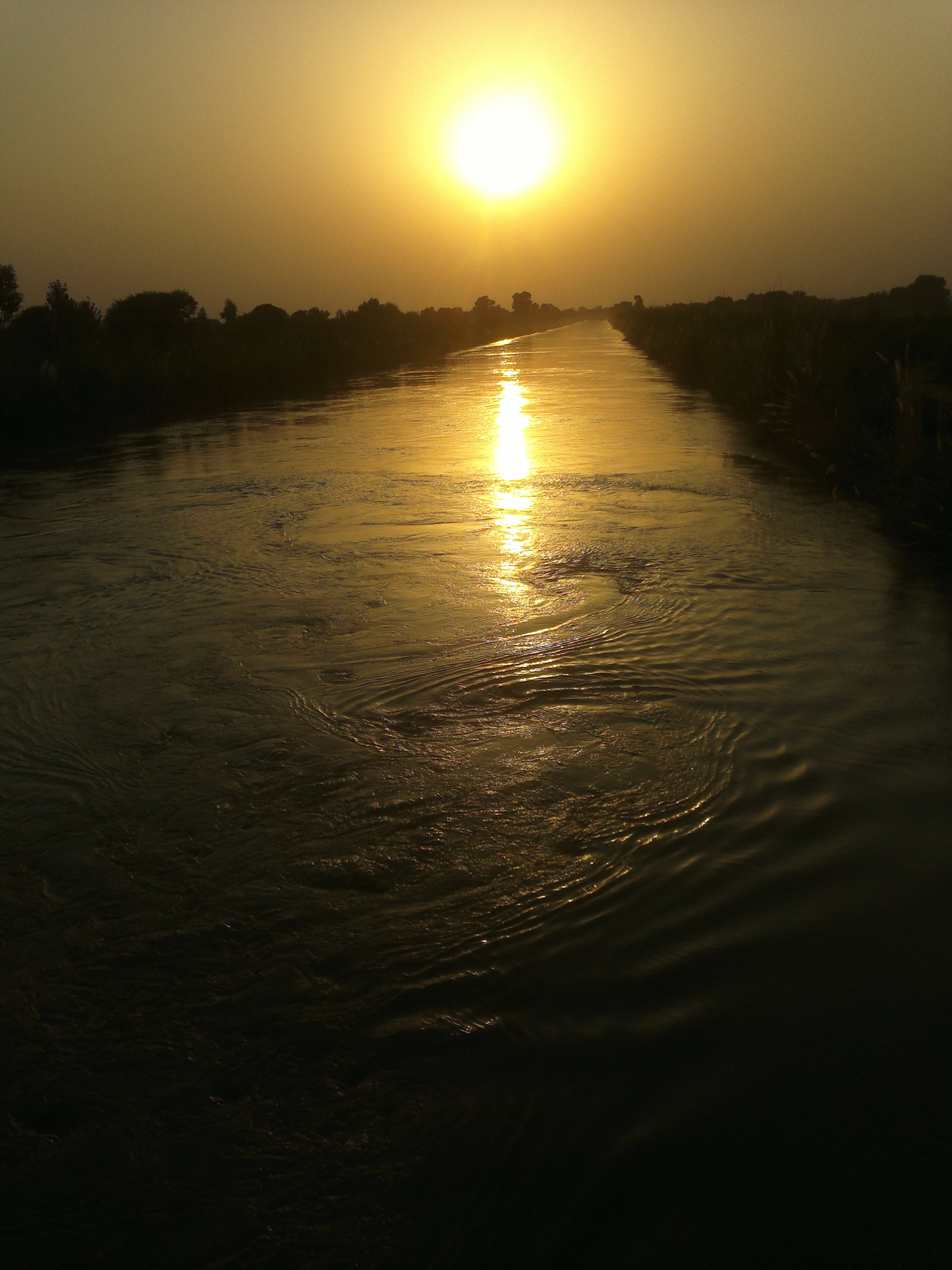
- Chashma Right Bank Canal

- Location within Pakistan
- Country: Pakistan
- Location: Chashma, Damaan, Punjab
- Purpose: Irrigation
- Status: Operational

Chashma Right Bank Irrigation Project (CRBIP) is located at Chashma in Mianwali District, Punjab, Pakistan. Chashma Right Bank Canal off-takes from Chashma Barrage on its right bank and extends southward up to Taunsa Barrage on Indus River. Chashma Right Bank Irrigation Canal was constructed to cultivate an area of 606,000 acres out of which 240,000 acres are in Punjab and 366,000 acres in Khyber Pakhtunkhwa.
