= Chashma Jhelum Link Canal =

Link canal between the Indus and Jhelum rivers in Pakistan

Chashma-Jhelum Link Canal
- Interactive map of Chashma-Jhelum Link Canal
- Location: Punjab
- Country: Pakistan
- Coordinates: 32.416559°N 71.458053°E

Specifications
- Status: Operational

History
- Date completed: 1971

Geography
- Start point: Chashma Barrage, Indus River
- End point: Jhelum River
- Connects to: Indus River; Jhelum River

The Chashma-Jhelum Link Canal (also called the C-J Link Canal) is an inter-river link canal in Punjab, Pakistan. It takes off from the left bank of Chashma Barrage on the Indus River and transfers water toward the Jhelum River, feeding the Haveli Canal and the Trimmu-Sidhnai-Mailsi-Bahawal link canal system associated with Trimmu Headworks in southern Punjab. It has a discharge capacity of approximately 615 cubic metres per second (21,700 cubic feet per second), the largest of Pakistan's inter-river link canals.

== History ==
The canal was completed in 1971 as part of the post-Indus Waters Treaty restructuring of the Indus Basin water system. Historian David Gilmartin writes that the canal was intended to move water out of the Indus to compensate for supplies lost from the Sutlej, Beas and Ravi rivers in southern Punjab, and that it formed part of a wider set of works, including the Taunsa-Panjnad Link and the Tarbela Dam, undertaken for the same purpose.

In early 1972, when engineers opened the canal fully to divert Indus water to southern Punjab during a period of shortage, some Sindhi politicians and commentators objected, with the writer and activist Rasul Bux Palijo describing it as a "robber canal". The government of Zulfikar Ali Bhutto responded by appointing a commission of provincial governors, headed by Mumtaz Bhutto, which initially recommended giving Sindh an effective veto over the canal's operation during periods of water shortage. The dispute resurfaced in the Punjab Assembly in the mid-1980s, when Punjabi politicians contested Sindh's right to demand the canal's closure.

== Water management ==
Operation of the canal has long been part of water-sharing disputes between Punjab and Sindh. Gilmartin notes that opening and closing the canal has remained controversial and, since the 1991 water accord, has fallen under the Indus River System Authority (IRSA). In July 2010, Punjab and Sindh agreed to close the canal after a dispute over an IRSA order to release water through it. In April 2015, the Sindh Assembly passed a resolution protesting another release of water to the canal.

== See also ==
- Irrigation in Pakistan
