= Chashma Barrage =

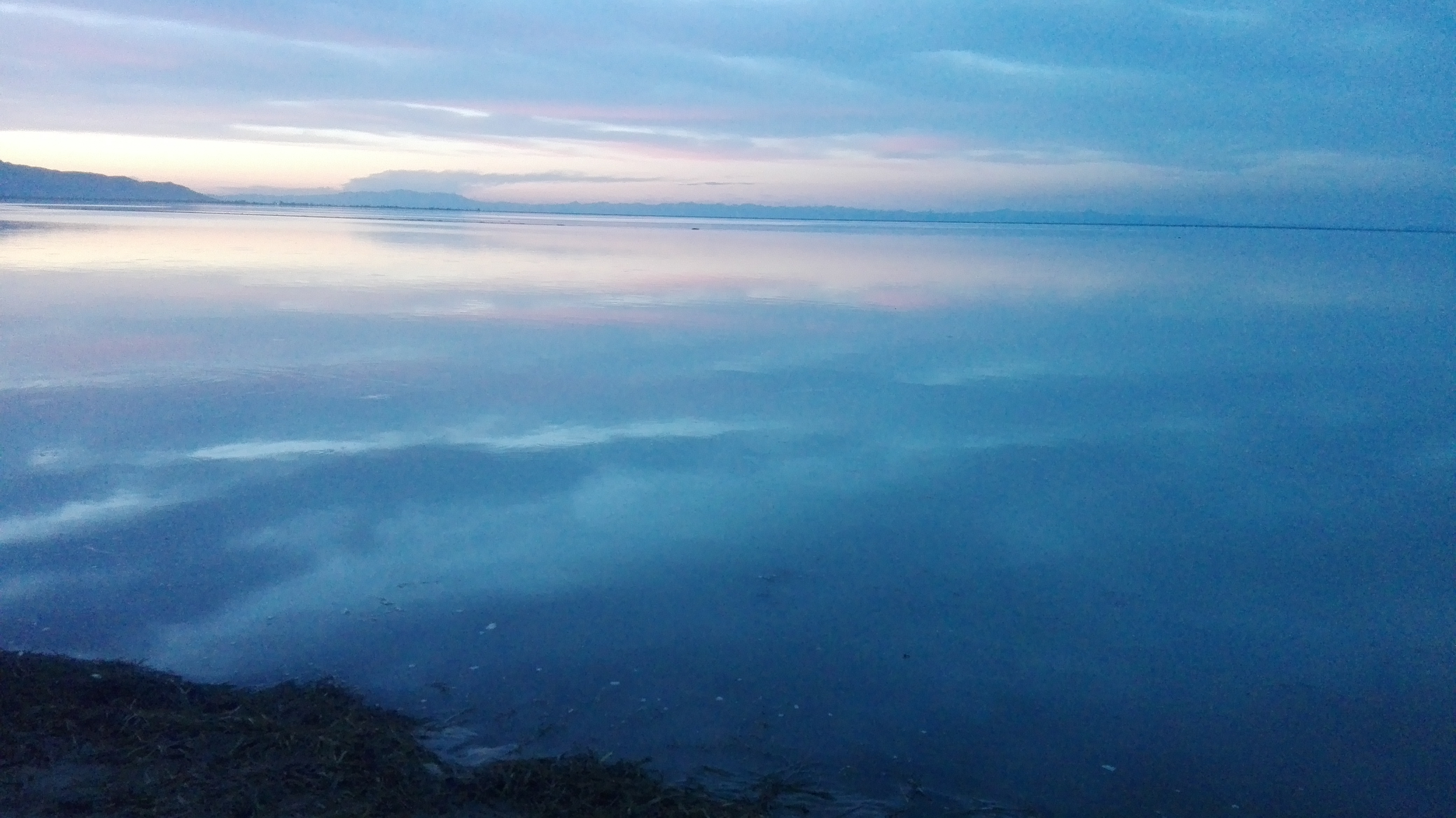
- Chashma Barrage Lake

- Location within Pakistan
- Location: Chashma, Mianwali District
- Coordinates: 32°26′02″N 71°22′44″E
- Purpose: Irrigation, power
- Status: Operational
- Construction began: 1967
- Opening date: 1971
- Construction cost: Rs 399 million
- Owner: WAPDA

Dam and spillways
- Impounds: Indus River
- Height: 11.28 m (37 ft)
- Length: 1,084 m (3,556 ft)
- Spillway capacity: 27,000 m^{3}/s (950,000 cu ft/s)

Power Station
- Hydraulic head: 4.8 m (16 ft) (rated)
- Turbines: 8 x 23 MW Kaplan-type turbines
- Installed capacity: 184 MW
- Annual generation: 675 GWh

Ramsar Wetland
- Designated: 22 March 1996
- Reference no.: 816

Chashma Barrage is a barrage on the River Indus in the Mianwali District of the Punjab province of Pakistan. It is 304 km northwest of Lahore and 56 km downstream of Jinnah Barrage. The contract for Chashma Barrage works was awarded on 10 February 1967, to French Consortium Société Dumez and Société Borie and was successfully completed by 25 March 1971. The total cost of Chashma Barrage works was Rs. 399 million but power generation started later in 2001. The installed capacity of power station is 184 MW, from eight Kaplan-type bulb turbine units, each with a 23 MW capacity. The bulb turbines have been installed for the first time in Pakistan. The first unit was commissioned in January 2001, while final commissioning of all units was completed in July 2001. The 8 Kaplan-type turbines and synchronous generator units were made by Fuji, Japan.

Chashma Barrage is used for irrigation, flood control and power generation. A Ramsar site is located nearby.

== Salient features ==
Length between abutments: 1,084 m (3,556 ft)
Total Bays: 52
Standard Bays: 41
Undersluce Bays: 11
Normal Pond Level: 195.6 m
Maximum Storage Level: 197.8 m
Maximum Flood Discharge: 950000 Cusecs
Maximum Intensity of Discharge: 300Cs. Per ft.
Width of Carriage Way: 7.3 m
Length of Navigation Lock: 47.2 m
Width of Navigation Lock: 9.1 m
Area of Reservoir: 139 square metres.
Initial Capacity: 0.87 MAF
Contract Price: Rs 399 Million
Date Commencement: 10 February 1967
Date of Completion: 25 March 1971
Contractor: Societe Dumes Enterprises Borie of France
Consulting Engineer: COODE & Partner London

== See also ==
- List of barrages and headworks in Pakistan
- List of dams and reservoirs in Pakistan
- List of power stations in Pakistan
