= Punjab Irrigation Department =

Pakistani provincial ministry department

- پنجاب محکمہ آبپاشی

Department overview
- Jurisdiction: Punjab, Pakistan
- Headquarters: Lahore
- Motto: Crescat e Fluviis (Latin) “Let it Grow from the Rivers”
- Employees: 27000
- Minister responsible: Kazim Ali Pirzada, Minister of Irrigation, Punjab
- Department executive: Secretary Irrigation, Punjab
- Website: https://irrigation.punjab.gov.pk/

The Punjab Irrigation Department (Punjabi, Urdu: محکمہ آبپاشی پنجاب) is a provincial government department responsible for irrigation in the Punjab province of Pakistan. It irrigates 21 million acres (8,500,000 ha) of the agricultural land in the province.

== History ==
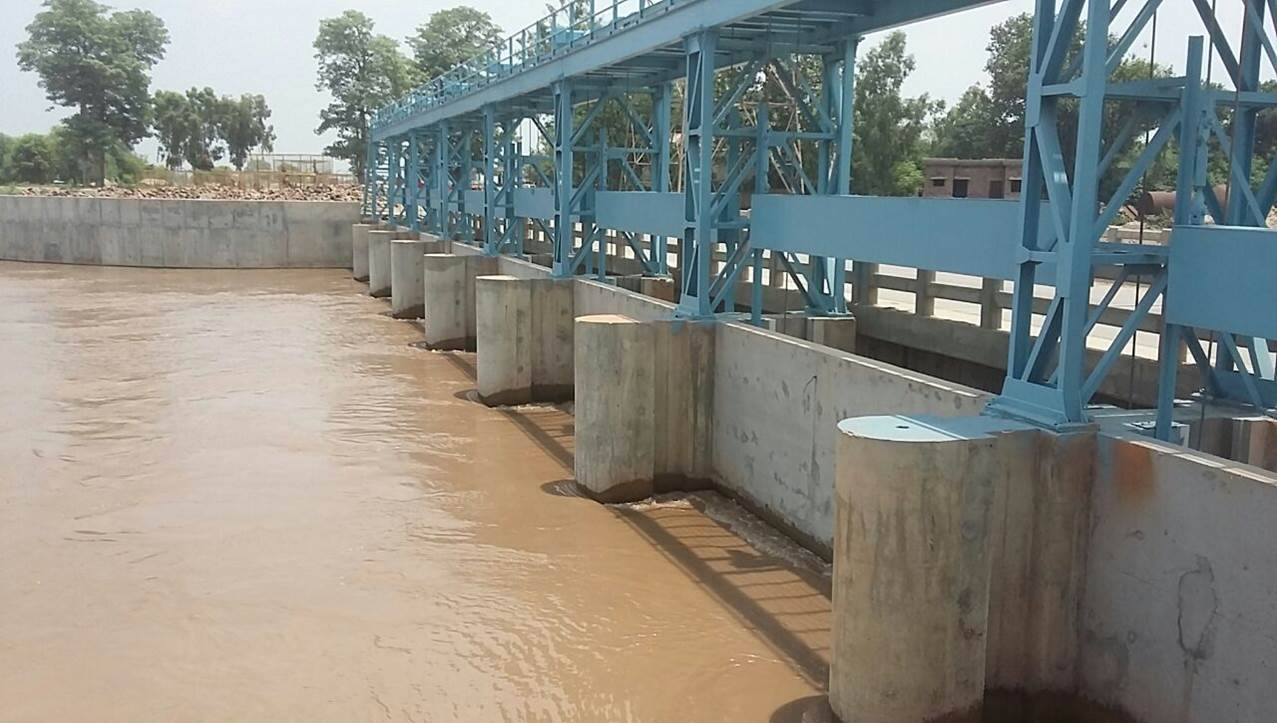
Balloki Sulemanki Link Canal Head Regulator

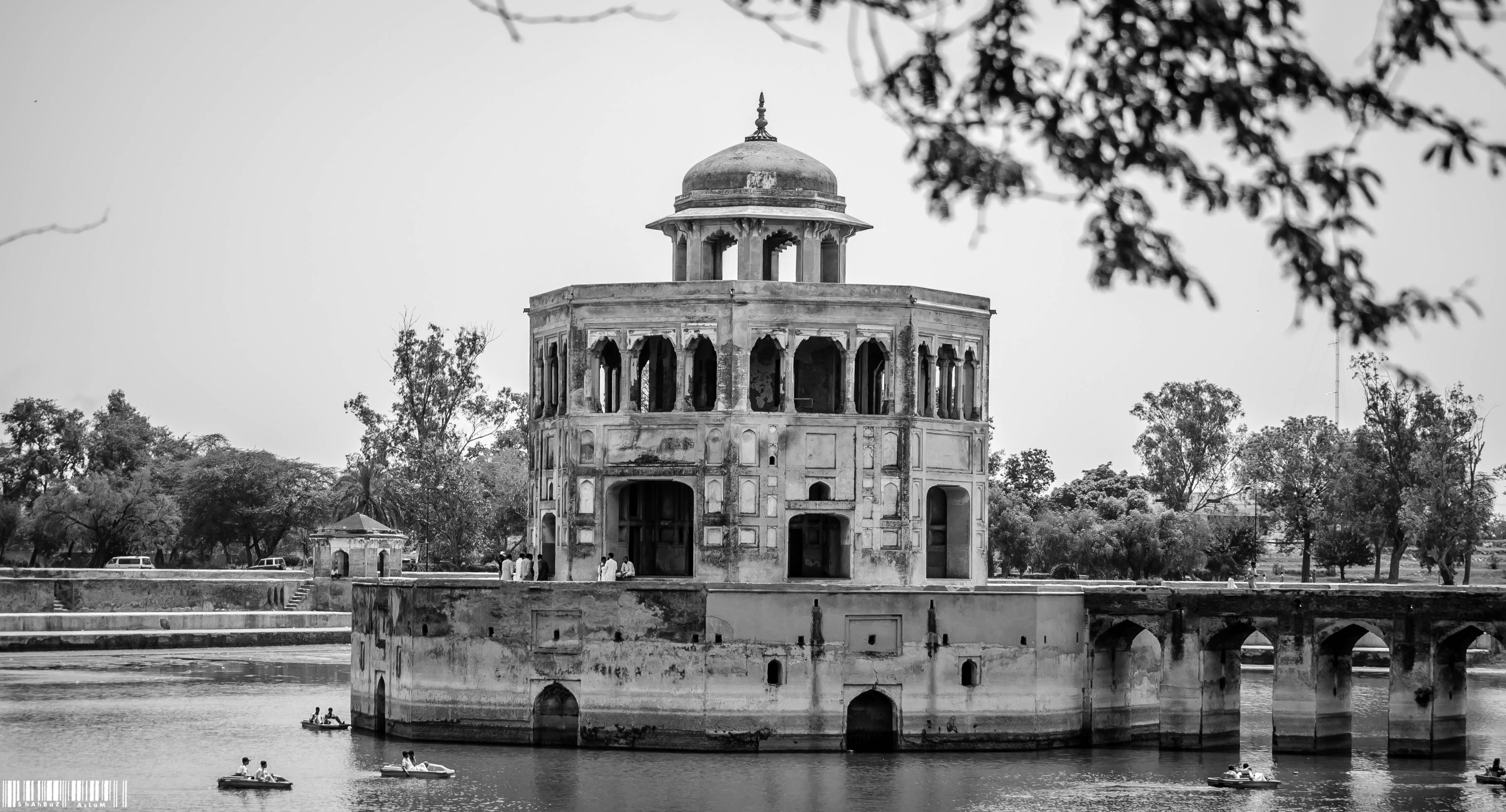
Hansli Canal reservoir at Hiran Minar built by Mughal Emperor Jahangir

The Indus Basin has a long history of irrigation dating back to 4000 year old Indus valley civilization in Harrapa and Mohenjodaro settlements. At the time, irrigation in the region was done mainly through inundation canals. Hansli Canal off-taking from River Ravi and Shah Nehar off-taking from River Beas built during Mughal period are worth mentioning as major inundation canals in the region. The former was built by emperor Jahangir to irrigate his hunting ground near Sheikhupura. It was 80 kilometre long and had a reservoir at Hiran Minar. This was first perennial canal of the Indus Basin.

The history of modern Punjab Irrigation Department can be traced back to the establishment of five major canals in the region in early 20th century when the British built Lower Chenab Canal, Lower Jhelum Canal, Upper Jhelum Canal, Upper Chenab Canal and Lower Bari Doab Canal. Three of these canals namely Upper Jhelum Canal, Upper Chenab Canal and Lower Bari Doab Canal were built by John Benton when he was chief engineer in Public Works Department, Punjab. The Triple Canal System scheme was sanctioned in 1905 and was completed in 1917.

Another colonization scheme which extended the canal network in what is now southern Punjab was the Sutlej Valley Project which was undertaken by the British Indian government in 1922-33. Ferozepur, Suleimanki, Islam and Panjand headworks and off-taking canals were built under the scheme.

The Indus Waters Treaty which was signed between India and Pakistan in 1960 was a major watershed in the history of development of irrigation infrastructure in the province. The treaty gave the rights of the three eastern rivers of the Indus basin namely Ravi, Sutlej and Beas to India and thus necessitated the construction of inter river link canals to haul water from Indus, Jhelum and Chenab to the eastern parts of the province. It was after this treaty that Pakistan built Tarbela and Mangla reservoirs to store monsoon water for winter months to continue to irrigate the fields year round.

The second major development post independence in the history of irrigation in Punjab was 1991 Water Accord between all the four provinces of Pakistan. This accord gave Punjab province 55.94 million acre feet of water share annually for its irrigation and drinking usages. It is with this share that the Punjab Irrigation Department caters to its 21 million acres of command area in the province.

== Services ==
Punjab Irrigation Department is responsible for delivering the following services in the province:

- Provision of irrigation supplies to farmers
- Construction, maintenance and operation of irrigation infrastructure
- Flood planning and management
- Basic and applied research in hydraulics, groundwater and land reclamation
- Construction of reservoirs
- Vertical and surface drainage
- Management of workshop and machinery pool

== Barrages ==
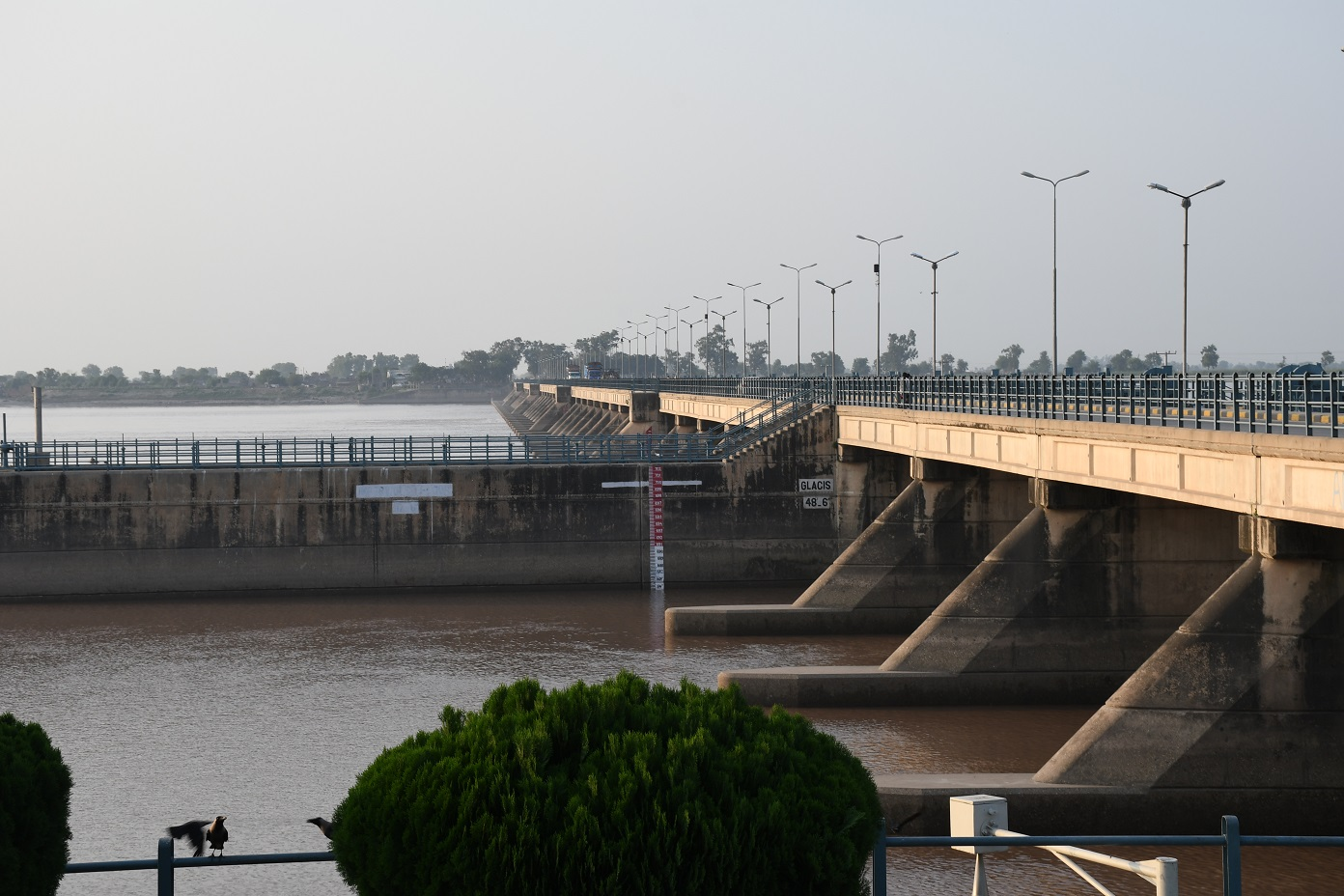
Qadirabad Barrage at River Chenab

Punjab Irrigation Department Manages the following barrages:

1. Jinnah Barrage on River Indus
2. Taunsa Barrage on River Indus
3. Rasul Barrage on River Jhelum
4. Marala Headworks on River Chenab
5. Qadirabad Barrage on River Chenab
6. New Khanki Barrage River Chenab
7. Balloki Barrage on River Ravi
8. Trimmu Barrage on River Chenab
9. Sidhnai Barrage on River Ravi
10. Islam Barrage on River Sutlej
11. Suleimanki Barrage on River Sutlej
12. Panjnad Barrage on River Indus

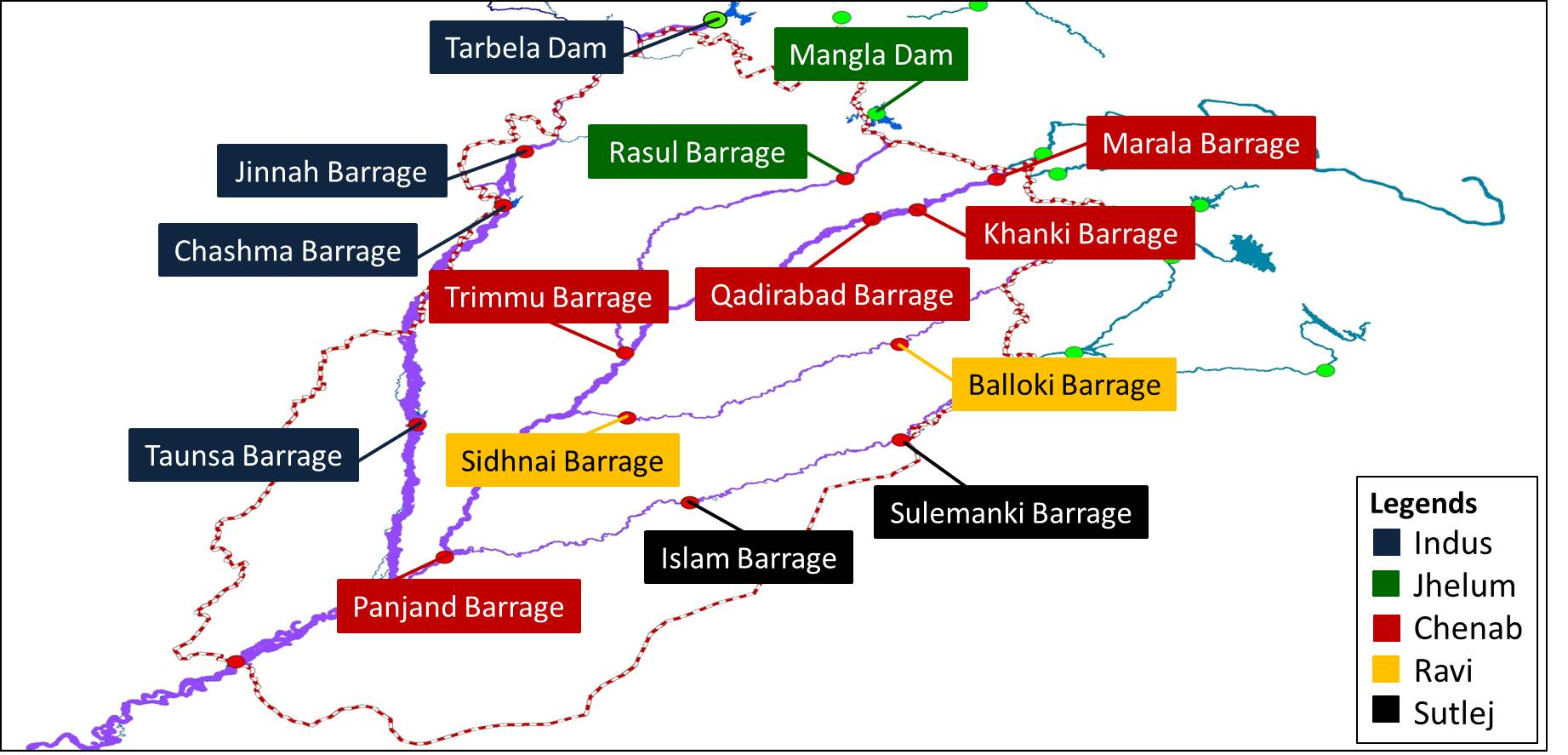
Main Canals and barrages in Punjab

== Zones ==
For the purpose of administration and management the Punjab irrigation system is divided into the following 8 operational zones:

=== Lahore Zone ===
There are following operational circles in Lahore Zone:

- Upper Chenab Canal Circle
- Depalpur Canal Circle
- Link Canal Circle
- Lahore Drainage Circle
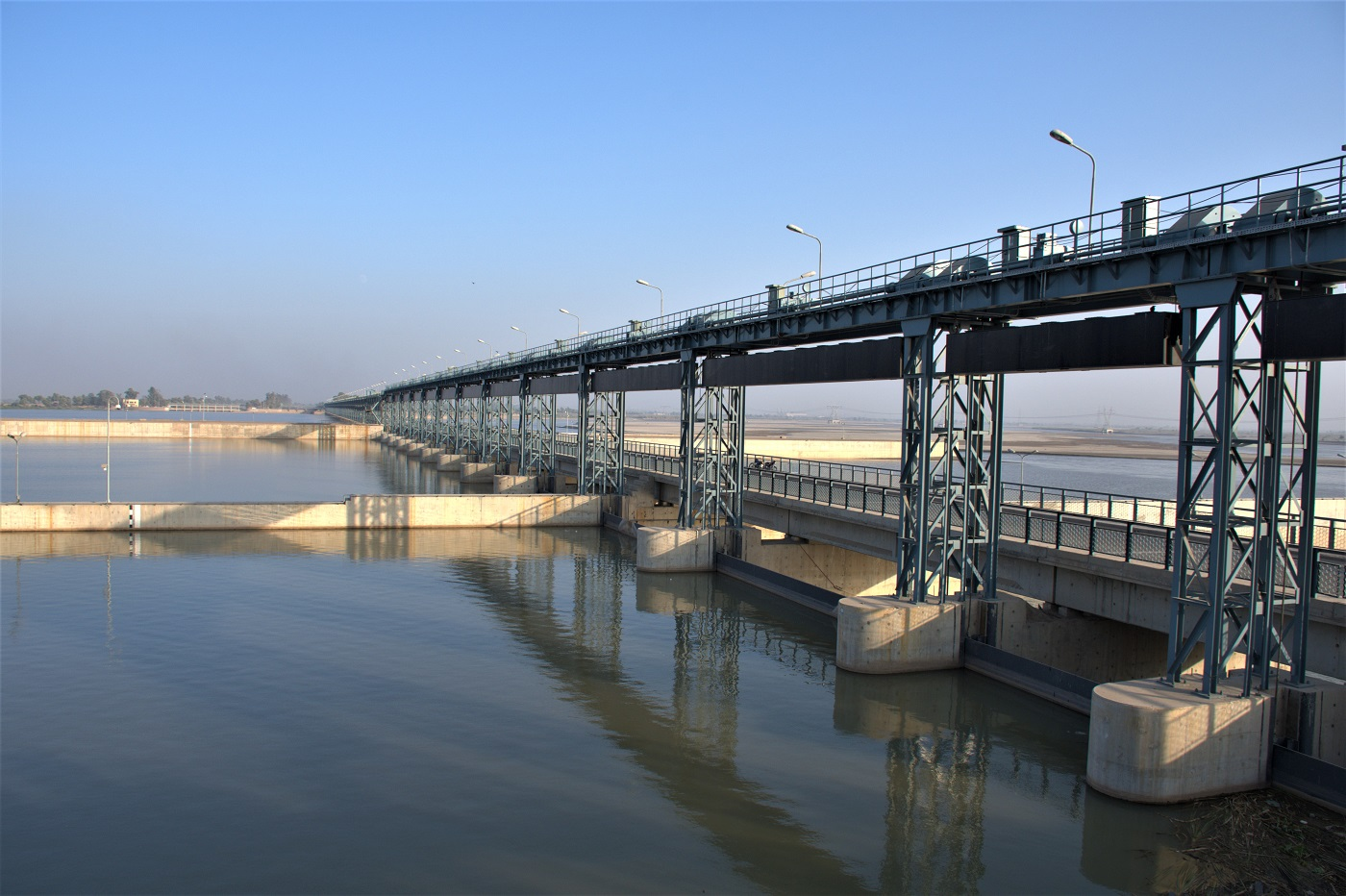
- Trimmu Barrage at River Chenab
  Development Circle

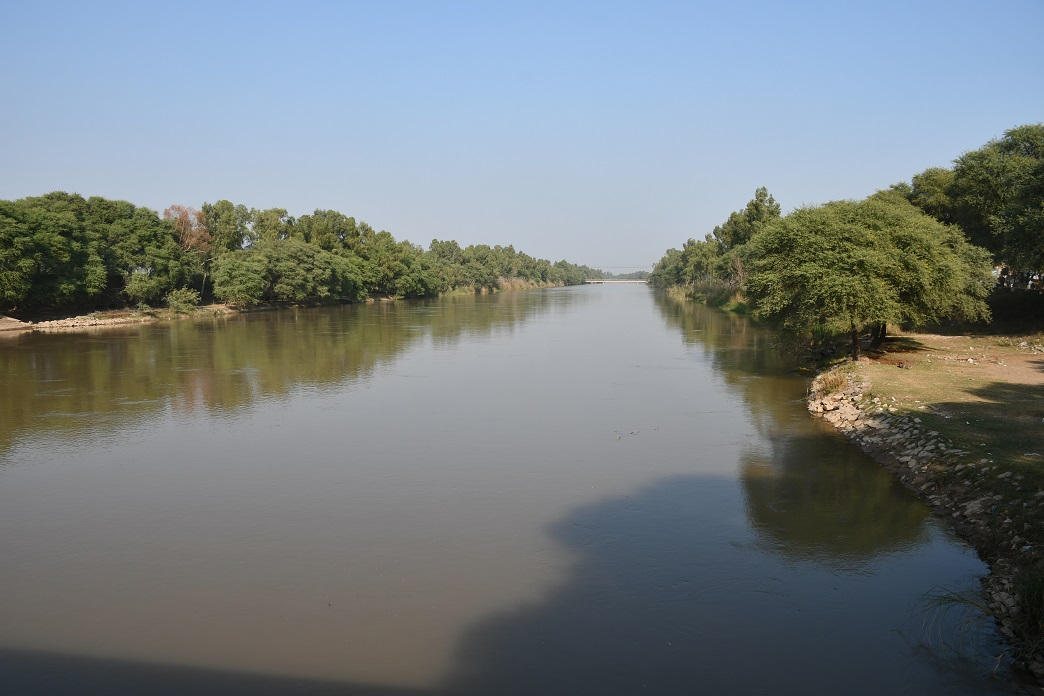
Rasul Qadirabad Link Canal

=== Faisalabad Zone ===
There are following operational circles in Faisalabad Zone:

- Lower Chenab Canal East Circle
- Lower Chenab Canal West Circle
- Drainage Circle
- Qadirabad Balloki Link Canal Circle
- Development Circle

=== Sargodha Zone ===
There are following operational circles in Sargodha Zone:

- Upper Jhelum Canal Circle
- Lower Jhelum Canal Circle
- Thal Canal Circle
- Drainage Circle
- Greater Thal Canal Circle

=== Multan Zone ===
There are following operational circles in Multan Zone:

- Haveli Canal Circle
- Development Circle
- Mailsi Canal Circle

=== Sahiwal Zone ===
Sahiwal Zone consists of the following circles:

- Nilibar Circle
- Lower Bari Doab Circle
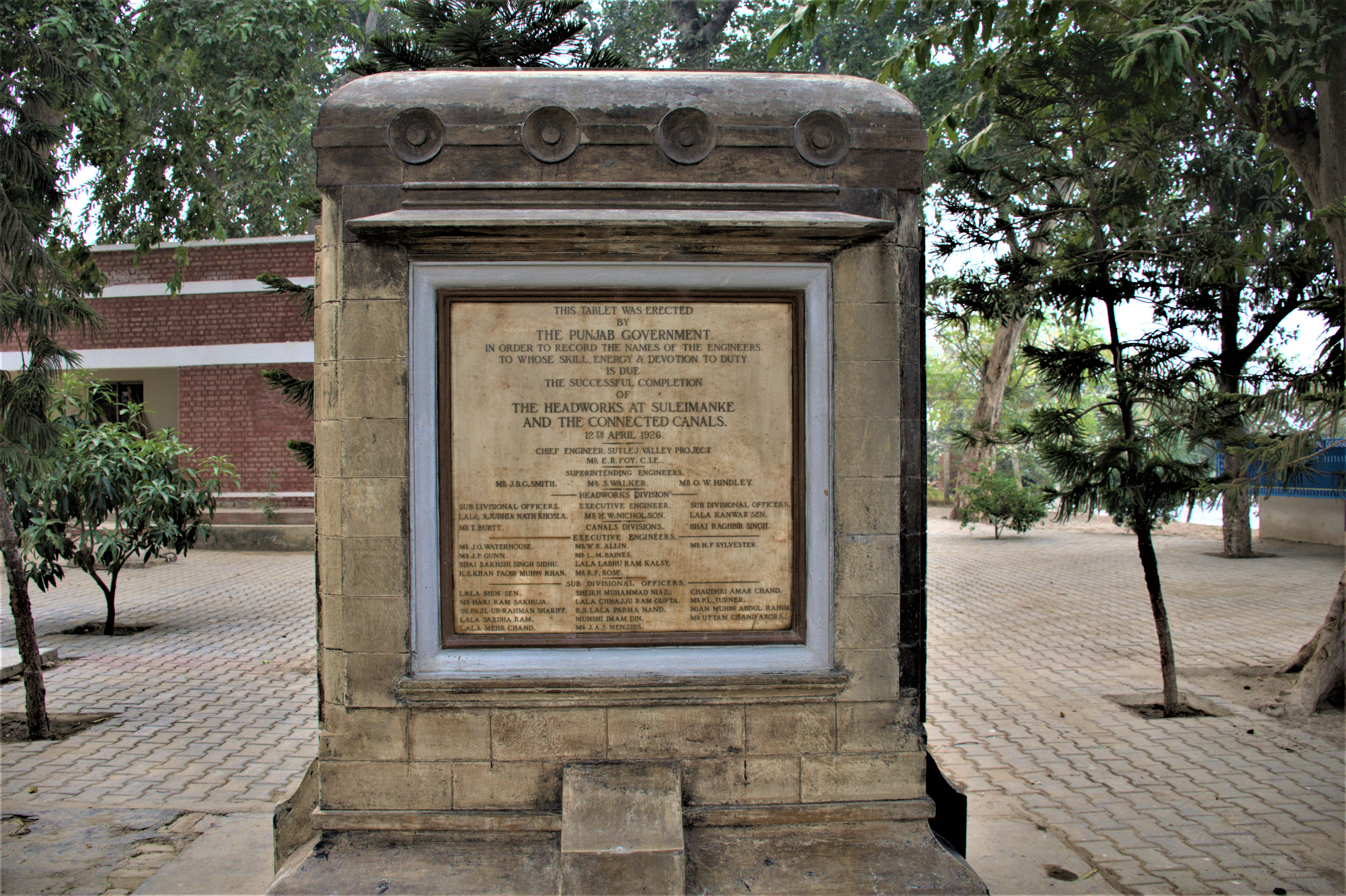
- Plaque at Sulemanki Headworks that records of the names of all the engineers who participated in the construction
  Sukhrawa Circle

=== Bahawalpur Zone ===
There are following operational circles in Bahawalpur Zone:

- Bahawalpur Canal Circle
- Bahawalnagar Canal Circle
- Rahimyarkhan Canal Circle
- Panjnad Canal Circle

=== DG Khan Zone ===
There are following operational circles in Dera Ghazi Khan Zone:

- Derajat Circle
- Muzaffargarh Canal Circle
- Project Circle

=== Potohar Zone ===
This zone has been recently established to look after the small dams in the Potohar region of Punjab

Each operational zone is headed by a chief engineer and each circle is headed by a superintending engineer and they are supported by an extended team of executive engineers, sub-divisional officers, sub-engineers, mates and baildars. In addition to operational zones, the department has following zones for overall planning and management of irrigation operations:

- Drainage and Flood zone
- Research zone
- Development zone

Punjab Irrigation Department also manages Government Engineering Academy Punjab which provides pre-service and in-service training to irrigation engineers.

=== Service delivery ===
Punjab Irrigation Department delivers irrigation supplies to farmers through 51,990 outlets in its system of 24 main canals and distribution canals spanning 22,700 kilometers.

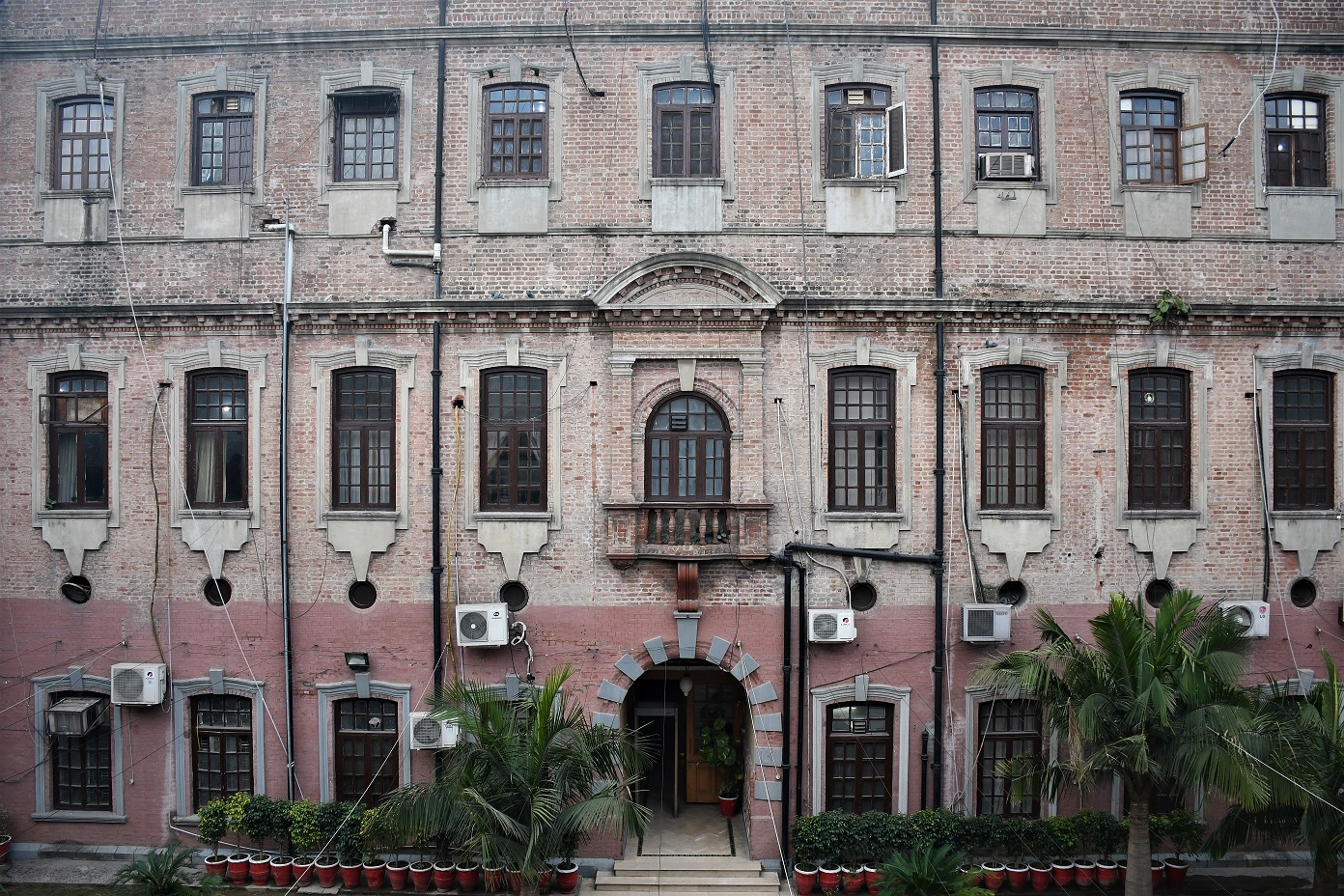
Secretariat of Irrigation Department

The Punjab Irrigation Department has its head office in Old Anarkali, Lahore. Punjab Irrigation Department has complaint hotline 0800 11 333 for registration of complaints regarding irrigation supply issues. Daily canal discharges at all the canals in the entire system can be checked at the official website of the department.

== Units ==
For the purpose of management of various projects and institutional reforms the Punjab Irrigation Department has established the following Units:

- Program Monitoring and Implementation Unit
- Strategic Planning and Reforms Unit
- Project Management Office (Canals)
- Projects Management Office (Barrages)
- Flood Risk Assessment Unit
- Hydraulic Safety Structure Evaluation Unit

== Laws and policies ==
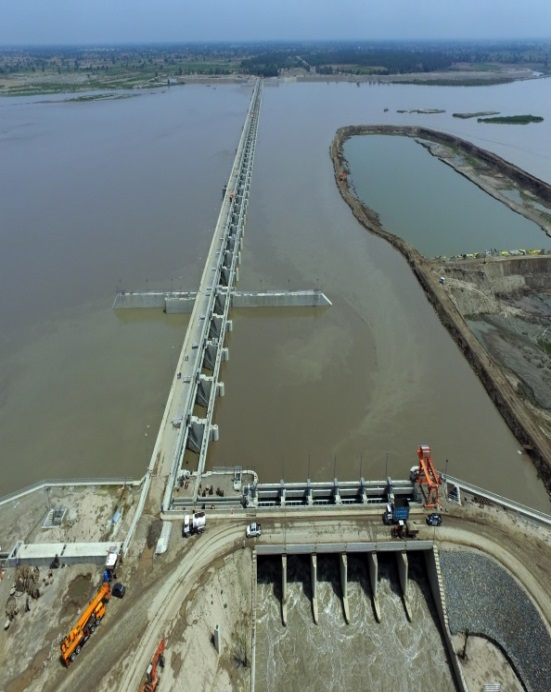
New Khanki Barrage during construction, Pakistan

Punjab Irrigation Department functions under Canal and Drainage Act 1873 which was introduced to regulate irrigation, navigation and drainage of provincial territories. The purpose of this act is that the Provincial Government is entitled to use and control for public purposes, the water of all rivers and streams flowing in natural channels, and of all lake and other natural collections of still water in said territories. An amendment was made in Canal and Drainage Act in 2016. In 2019, the Government introduced Punjab Water Act 2019 to regulate the usage of surface and groundwater in the province. In 2023, Punjab Irrigation Department introduced Punjab Irrigation Drainage and Rivers Act 2023 . The act was introduced to update the century old irrigation laws in the province.

== Major developments ==
In 2010-11 completed the Taunsa Barrage rehabilitation and modernization project with cost of Rs. 11 billion rupees. Punjab Irrigation Department Completed the Punjab Irrigation completed the construction of New Khanki Barrage in August 2017 which replaced the old Khanki Headworks which irrigated 3.03 million acres of fertile land in 8 districts of central Punjab.

Punjab Irrigation Department has, in December 2019, inaugurated the construction of Jalalpur Irrigation Canal System. The 117 kilometer long canal will originate from River Jhelum at Rasul Barrage and, along with its branches, will irrigate 1,70,000 acres of arid land in Districts of Jhelum and Khushab. The department has also initiated works on Dadocha Dam which will supply 35 million gallons of drinking per day to the people of Rawalpindi. In addition to this civil works on projects like Rehabilitation of Trimmu and Panjnad Barrages, rehabilitation of Trimmu-Sidhnai Canal, SMB Link Canal, Ahmadpur Branch and Eastern Sadiqia Canal were also carried out.

Punjab Irrigation Department launched E-abiana system in partnership with Punjab Information and Technology Board in 2021. The new digital water revenue assessment and collection system was launched in the pilot phase in Kasur, Sheikhupura, Khanwah and Layyah Canal Divisions. The new system has enabled irrigators to pay their water charges through different mobile applications and instead of old manual revenue bills irrigators now receive digitally generated bills.
