= Guddu Barrage =

Indus River barrage in Sindh, Pakistan

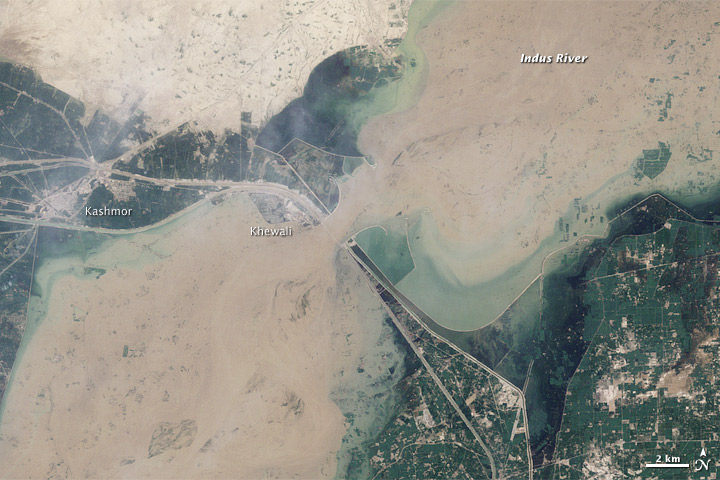
- Guddu barrage inundated during 2010 Pakistan floods
- Interactive map of Guddu Barrage
- Official name: گڏو بئراج
- Country: Pakistan
- Location: Sindh
- Coordinates: 28°25′07″N 69°42′48″E
- Opening date: 1962
- Operators: Sindh Irrigation & Power Department

Dam and spillways
- Impounds: Indus River
- Length: 1,355 meters
- Spillway capacity: Up to 1.2 million cusec

Guddu Barrage (Sindhi: گڏو بئراج; Urdu: گڈو بیراج)is a barrage on the Indus River near Kashmore in the Sindh province of Pakistan. President Iskander Mirza laid the foundation-stone of Guddu Barrage on 2 February 1957. The barrage was completed in 1962 at a cost of 474.8 million rupees and inaugurated by Field Marshal Ayub Khan in 1962.

Guddu Barrage is used to control water flow in the River Indus for irrigation and flood control purposes.

It has a discharge capacity of 34,000 cubic metres per second (1.2×10^{6} cu ft/s). It is a gate-controlled weir type barrage with a navigation lock. The barrage has 64 bays, each 18 metres (60 ft) wide. The maximum flood level height of Guddu Barrage is 7.9 metres (26 ft). It controls irrigation supplies to 12,000 square kilometres (2.9×10^{6} acres) of agricultural land in the Kashmore, Jacobabad, Larkana and Sukkur districts of Sindh province and the Naseerabad district of Balochistan province. It feeds Ghotki Feeder, Begari Feeder, Desert and Pat Feeder canals.

== Downstream ==
The Main channel of Indus River has 3 main barrages in Sindh, from north to south, Guddu Barrage near Kashmore on the border of Sindh and Punjab, Sukkur Barrage on the northern end of Nara Desert which created downstream Nara Canal system, Kotri Barrage near Hyderabad. The water distribution of Indus River between India-Pakistan was used to be determined by the Indus Waters Treaty until India put the treaty in abeyance.

Upstream in Punjab, Cholistan Canal Project is one of the major project.

== Rehabilitation of Guddu Barrage ==
Bidding process for the Guddu barrage rehabilitation and modernization project has been finalized with the lowest bid offered by Descon engineering that was handed over to technical team for evaluation. Spokesperson of Sindh Irrigation Development Authority (SIDA) informed APP on Saturday that an umbrella project - Sindh Barrage Improvement Project (SBIP)- was being implemented for improving the reliability and safety of the barrages situated on river Indus in Sindh province besides strengthening Sindh Irrigation Department's capacity to operate and manage the barrage.

The ECNEC approved the project worth Rs 20,241 million on March 13, 2015. Under the project rehabilitation and modernization of Guddu Barrage to be carried out in first phase with estimated cost of Rs. 1979 million and the date of completion was set June 2020. The project also includes Foreign Project Assistance (FPA) of around Rs.1780 million through International Development Association- development arm of the World Bank.

According to sources at irrigation department, the bidding process for construction works of the project was held the other day in which Descon engineering of Pakistan, China Harbor Guangxi Hydro electric and Cinotech Xejiang JV offered their bids and Descon was selected for offering the lowest bid in presence of concerned officials and representative of Transparency International. The bid would be evaluated by the technical team and then its report and bid documents would be forwarded to financing partner IDA for further evaluation.

The Descon already undertook mega projects like Taunsa Barrage rehabilitation and modernization, Sukkur Barrage rehabilitation and modernization, Kacchi canal, Rainee canal and Mangla Dam raising projects. SIDA spokesman informed that primary function of the Guddu Barrage was to provide irrigation water to over one million hectares of agricultural lands in the Jacobabad, Larkana, Sukkur and the Naseerabad districts, by feeding the Ghotki Feeder and Rainee canals on the left (east) side and the Begari Sindh (BS) Feeder and Desert Pat Feeder canals on the right (west) side.

The Guddu Barrage has a span of 1,400 meters. It consists of 64 gates of 18 meters each and one navigation lock with a span of 15 meters. The barrage is also used for river control and flood management. It has been designed to pass a super-flood discharge of up to 33,980 cubic metres per seconds (m3/sec). The barrage is also an important transport link across the River Indus and provides cooling water for the thermal power station at Guddu while two major gas lines cross the barrage.

The barrage was commissioned in 1962 and has now seen over 50 years of active service. Sindh Barrages Improvement Project (SBIP) under which the Guddu Barrage rehabilitation will be carried out is needed due to natural ageing of the infrastructure. The rehabilitation work will eliminate possible sources of failure and potentially give the structure another 50 years of life. The SBIP will support the gate replacement works to improve the regulation and the flow of the barrage, the replacement of 64 main barrage steel gates, 25 main canal head regulator gates, and hoist gears including all mechanical and electrical equipment.

This project will also finance the independent Panel of Experts, who will review, monitor, evaluate, and help guide the rehabilitation process with regard to the safety of the barrage. The primary beneficiaries include over 2.6 million people, across three million acres of irrigated land in Kashmore, Ghotki, Jacobabad, Sukkur, and Shikarpur districts of Sindh, and Nasirabad and Jafarabad districts of Balochistan, who will receive reliable supply of water while local communities in flood-vulnerable areas who will benefit from improvement in flood management and reduction in risks of embankment breaches; since the capacity of the barrage to pass flood waters will improve as well.

== See also ==
- List of barrages and headworks in Pakistan
- List of dams and reservoirs in Pakistan
- Guddu, Pakistan
- Guddu Thermal Station
