= Pakpattan Canal =

Canal in Pakistan

Coordinates: 29°57′N 71°51′E

Pakpattan Canal is an irrigation canal in central Punjab, Pakistan. The canal is extracted from Sulemanki Headworks.

The canal is named after Pakistani city of Pakpattan.

== Salient Features ==
Upper Pakpattan Canal

Design discharge : 6594 cusecs ( of taking from Suleimanki Headworks)

Lower Pakpattan Canal

Design Discharge : 1585 cusecs (of taking from SMB Link)

== Administrative Setup ==
Pakpattan Canal is administrated by

1. Multan Irrigation Zone- Multan
2. Nili Bar Circle- Sahiwal
3. Suleimanki Division-Suleimanki
4. Eastern Bar Division-Pakpattan
5. Western Bar Division- Thingi

== Tributary Canals ==
Length of canal is measured in canal miles. Pakpattan Canal has 66 branch canals, 691 distributaries and 440 minors and sub-minors.

== Power Plant setup ==
There is a plan to set a power plant on this canal which will provide 2.82 MW. 14 km transmission will cost 82 million PKRs. The electricity will be provided to MEPCO via 132 kv Pakpattan power station.
