= Trimmu Barrage =

Dam on the Chenab in Punjab, Pakistan

- Interactive map of Trimmu Barrage
- Official name: تریموں بیراج
- Country: Pakistan
- Location: Jhang District, Punjab, Pakistan
- Coordinates: 31.1443436°N 72.1464353°E
- Construction began: 1938-1939

Dam and spillways
- Length: 3085 feet
- Spillways: 37 + 13
- Spillway type: Bays

Reservoir
- Total capacity: 875000 cusecs

Trimmu Barrage is a barrage on the River Chenab in Jhang District of the Punjab province of Pakistan. It is situated downstream of the confluence of the Jhelum and Chenab rivers. It is situated some 25 kilometres (16 mi) from the city of Jhang near the city of Athara Hazari where the River Jhelum flows into the River Chenab. It was one of the 7 link canals to be built under the Indus Water Plan of Pakistan. Pakistan created this plan after concluding the Indus Water Treaty with India. Trimmu Barrage is used to control water flow into the River Chenab for irrigation and flood control.

== History ==
During 1938–1939, Trimmu Barrage was constructed by British engineers spearheaded by Chief Engineer James Douglas Hardy Bedford (b. 1 June 1884, Bhosawal), designed primarily to safeguard Jhang and its surrounding areas from seasonal flooding. The architectural design of Trimmu Barrage integrates an arched grid-iron bridge supported by a network of protective bands, showcasing engineering techniques of the early 20th century.

In 2020, major rehabilitation and extensive modernization was undertaken at the barrage, aimed at bolstering its operational efficiency and structural resilience, which included the construction of new gates, maintenance of the original structures, and the reconstruction of bridges to improve functionality and durability.

Between 2021 and 2023, the Trimmu Barrage underwent a major rehabilitation and modernization effort designed to bolster flood resilience and improve irrigation capacity. As part of this program, the barrage's discharge capacity was increased from approximately 645,000 cusecs to 875,000 cusecs.

== See also ==
- Chenab river dams and hydroelectric projects
- List of barrages and headworks in Pakistan
- List of dams and reservoirs in Pakistan
