= Sulemanki Headworks =

- Interactive map of Sulemanki Headworks
- Official name: سلیمانکی ہیڈورکس
- Country: Pakistan
- Location: Minchinabad Tehsil in Bahawalnagar District of the Punjab
- Coordinates: 30°22′39″N 73°52′0″E
- Purpose: Irrigation and Flood control

Dam and spillways
- Impounds: Sutlej River

Sulemanki Headworks is a headworks on the River Sutlej in Sulemanki village, in Minchinabad Tehsil in Bahawalnagar District of the Punjab province of Pakistan. The headworks is used for irrigation and flood control.

== History ==
Sulemanki Headworks is part of the Sutlej Valley Project. Jointly developed at the behest of the Nawab of Bahawalpur, Amir Sadiq Mohammed Khan V and the British Government, it was opened on 12 April 1926. It was an irrigation scheme to develop the neighbouring areas.

In 1925, the construction of the Pakpattan Canal took place in British Punjab on the right bank of the Sulemanki Headworks. This was undertaken to develop the Nilli bar colony in the south of Punjab. After the partition of British India, the left bank side of the Sulemanki Headworks became part of India which was later in 1961 transferred to Pakistan in exchange for right bank area of Hussainiwala headworks.

In Indo-Pakistani War of 1971, Major Shabbir Sharif, a Pakistani officer, the elder brother of General Raheel Sharif, former Chief of Pakistan Army Staff was killed in this border region. He was posthumously awarded Nishan-Haider, the highest Pakistani military honor for bravery.

== Geography ==
This headworks is located about 2 kilometres (1 mile) from the Indian border on the Sutlej River. From here originate three major canals which supply irrigation water to a large area in Southern Punjab and the Bahawalnagar district. The Upper Pakpattan Canal arises from its right bank, and two canals arise from the left. The canals on the left bank are Fordwah and Eastern Sadiqia Canal. The latter canal runs along the Pakistan-India border. After 74 km (46 mi) at Jalwala headworks, Eastern Sadiqia Canal trifurcates into Sirajwah distributary, Malik Branch Canal and Hakara Branch Canal. The Hakara branch runs in a southwesterly direction for another 121 km (75 mi) and is at a few places just a few meters from the Indian border. According to Pakistan army, it provides a major defensive landmark against any possible Indian intrusion. Therefore, it is of a significant strategic importance.

About 16 km (10 mi) upriver from the Sulemanki Headworks the Baloki-Sulemanki Link Canal has its outfall connecting the Ravi River to the Sutlej River and thus offsetting the loss of water to India as agreed upon in Indus Basin Water Treaty of 1960. According to that treaty, three eastern rivers, Ravi, Sutlej and Beas are allocated for the exclusive use of India before they enter Pakistan.

== Border ceremony ==
In accordance with the popularity of beating retreat ceremony at other Indo-Pakistan border crossings, such as at Wagah and Hussainiwala near Lahore, a smaller ceremony also takes place here at the Sulemanki by Pakistan Rangers and on the Indian side at Mahavir/Sadqi International Parade Ground check point by Indian Border Security Force (BSF). It attracts a sizable number of tourists on both sides.

== See also ==
- List of barrages and headworks in Pakistan
- List of dams and reservoirs in Pakistan
- Dams and hydroelectric power projects of Sutlej river
- Rivers of Jammu and Kashmir
