= Headworks =

Civil engineering term

Headworks is a civil engineering term for any structure at the head or diversion point of a waterway. It is smaller than a barrage and is used to divert water from a river into a canal or from a large canal into a smaller canal.

An example is the Horseshoe Falls at the start of the Llangollen Canal.

Historically the phrase "headworks" derives from the traditional approach of diverting water at the start of an irrigation network and the location of these processes at the "head of the works".

== See also ==
- List of barrages and headworks in Pakistan
