= Jinnah Barrage =

- Interactive map of Jinnah Barrage
- Location: Kalabagh, Mianwali District
- Coordinates: 32°55′06.71″N 71°31′18.92″E
- Purpose: Irrigation, power
- Status: Operational
- Construction began: 1939
- Opening date: 1946

Dam and spillways
- Impounds: Indus River
- Height: 8.5 m (28 ft)
- Length: 1,152 m (3,780 ft)
- Spillway capacity: 950,000 cu ft/s (27,000 m^{3}/s)

Power Station
- Hydraulic head: 4.8 m (16 ft) (rated)
- Turbines: 8 x 12 MW Pit turbines
- Installed capacity: 96 MW
- Annual generation: 688 GWh

The Jinnah Barrage is a barrage on the River Indus near Kalabagh, Pakistan. It is part of the Thal Project which helps irrigate 770,000 ha (1,900,000 acres) in the Sindh Sagar Doab east of the Indus. Planning for the project dates back to the nineteenth century but final plans for the barrage were made in 1919 and it was constructed between 1939 and 1946. The barrage diverts an average of 283 m^{3}/s (10,000 cu ft/s) of water into the 51.5 km (32.0 mi) long Thal Canal where it serves areas in Bhakkar, Khushab, Layyah, Mianwali and Muzaffargarh Districts with 3,362 km (2,089 mi) of additional canal branches and distributors. It has a maximum flood height of 8.5 m (28 ft) and it spans 1,152 m (3,780 ft) over the river. The barrage can discharge up to 27,000 m^{3}/s (950,000 cu ft/s) downstream with 42 spillway gates which are each 18.2 m (60 ft) wide. Between 2006 and 2012, a 96 MW hydroelectric power station with four 12 MW pit turbine-generators was added on the right bank. In June 2012 a major rehabilitation project for the barrage began. The project includes the construction of a weir 244 m (801 ft) downstream to help dissipate energy from the spillway upstream of it. New guide banks will be built and existing ones repaired. The railway bridge upstream will be rehabilitated as well. The project is expected to be complete in June 2016.
