= Barrage (dam) =

Type of dam

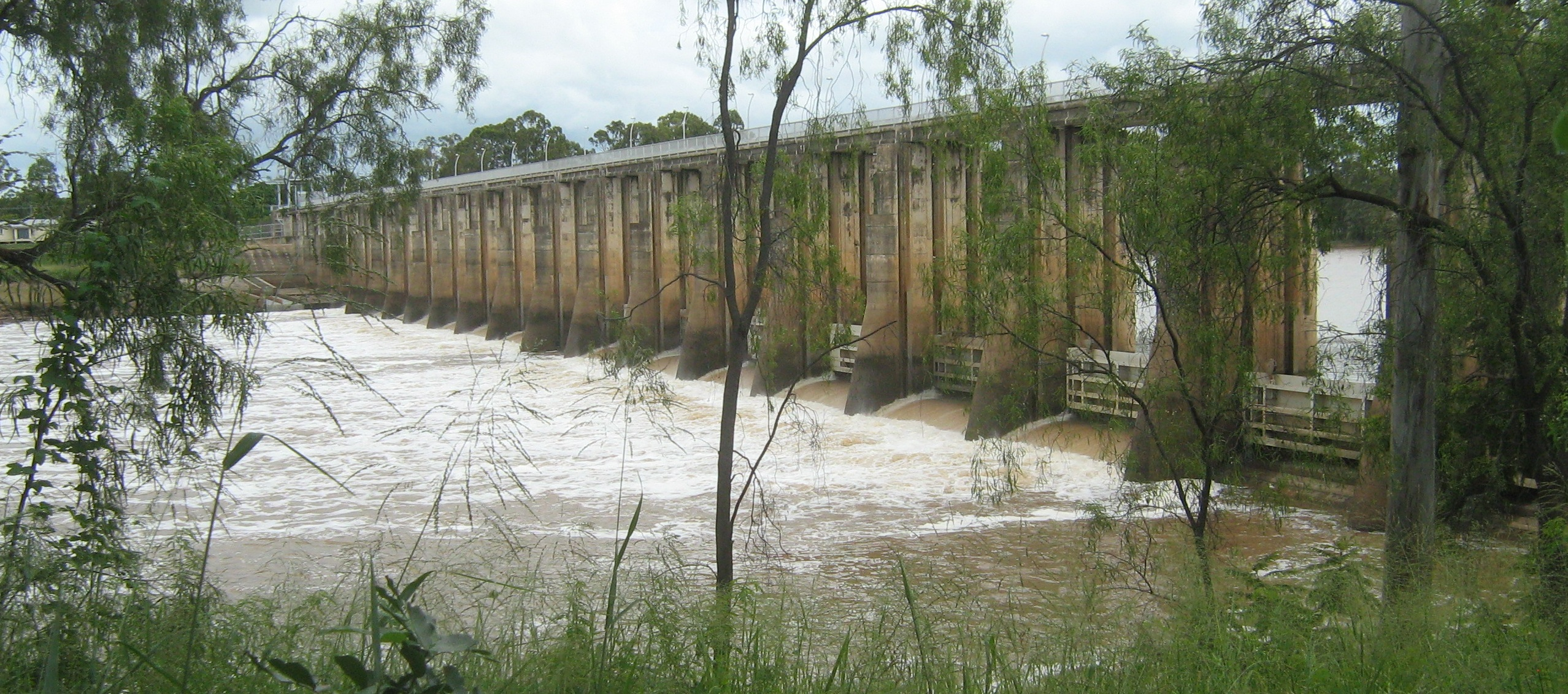
A barrage in Rockhampton, Australia

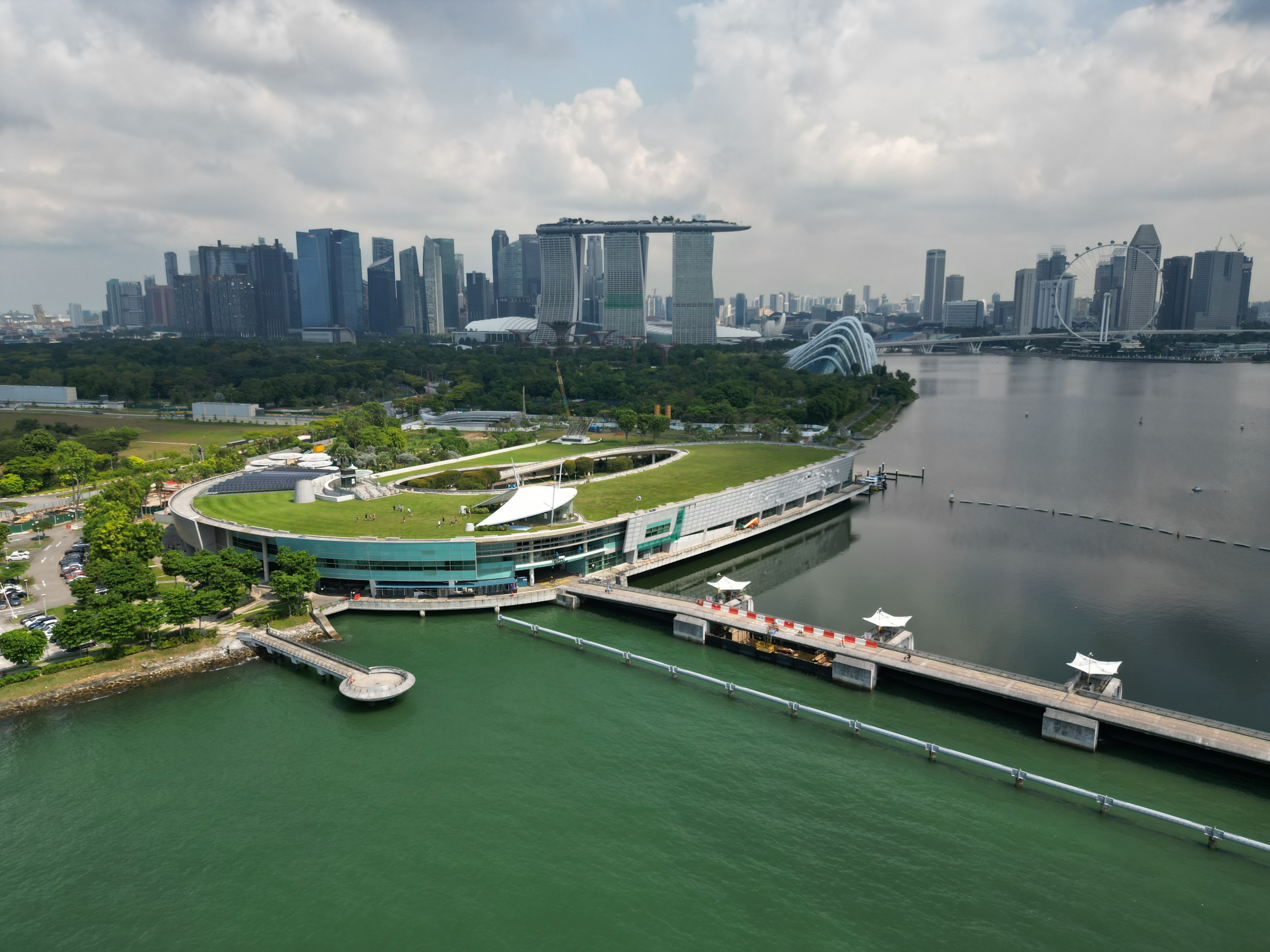
Marina Barrage, Singapore

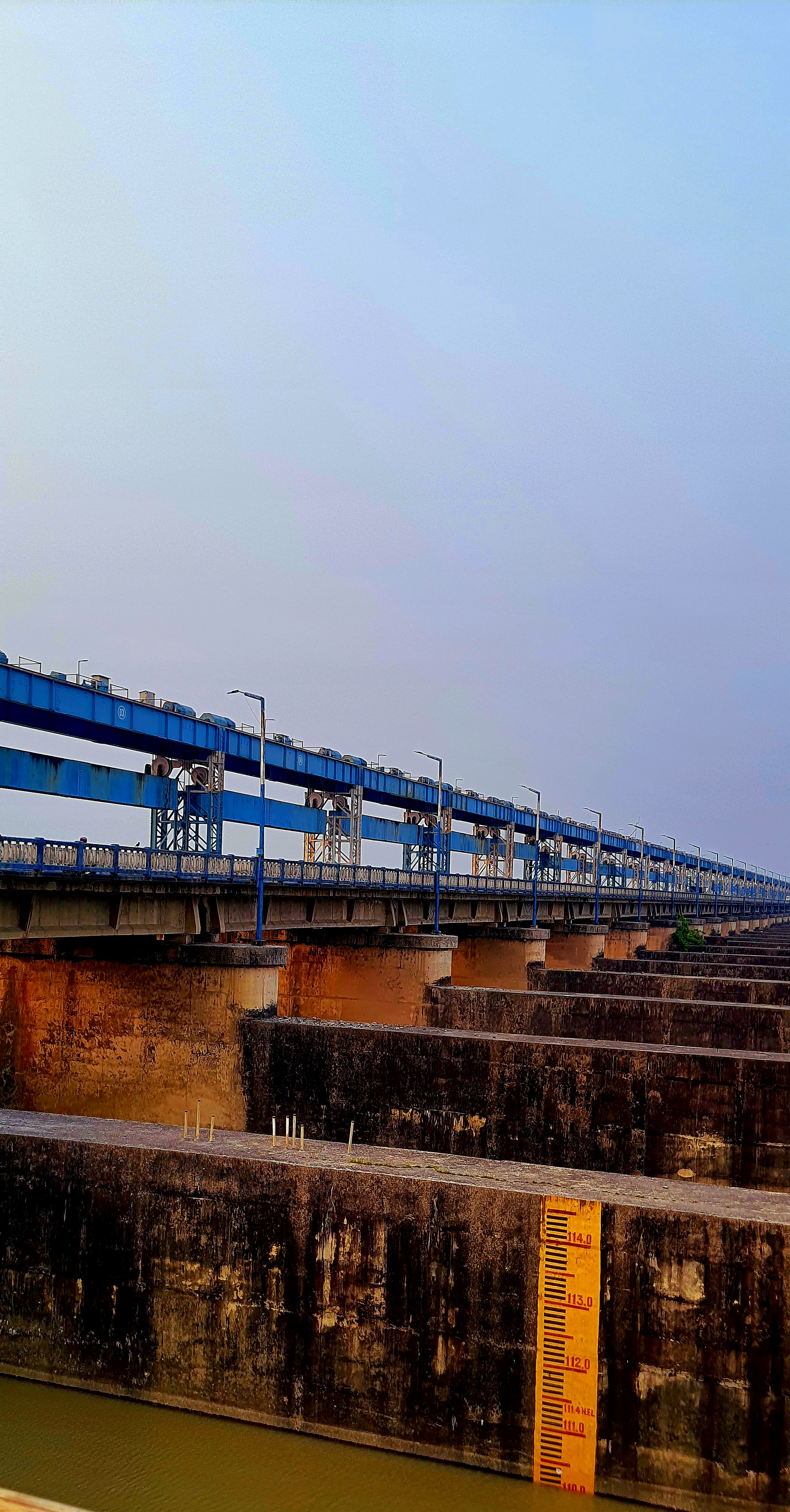
Teesta Barrage at Gajoldoba in West Bengal, India.

A barrage is a type of low-head, diversion dam which consists of a number of large gates that can be opened or closed to control the amount of water passing through. This allows the structure to regulate and stabilize river water elevation upstream for use in irrigation and other systems. The gates are set between flanking piers which are responsible for supporting the water load of the pool created.

The term barrage is borrowed from the French word "barrer" meaning "to bar".

== Etymology ==
The English usage of the term barrage originates from the Delta Barrage across the Nile branches north of Cairo, built between 1833 and 1862 by the French Linant de Bellefonds and Eugène Mougel employed by the Egyptian Public Works Department, with assistance from Barthélemy Prosper Enfantin and with the blessing of the Egyptian Viceroy of the Ottoman Empire, Muhammad Ali. When the British, after 1882, had to look after these structures generally referred to as barrages, they adopted the term in their language and continued to use it for similar structures built by themselves across the Nile (Zefta Barrage and Assiut Barrage, both completed in 1902). Since the British in the Egyptian Public Works Department kept close relations to their counterparts in British India, the term barrages made its way to present-day India and Pakistan, as well as to the Middle East and thus generally into English.

== Dam construction ==
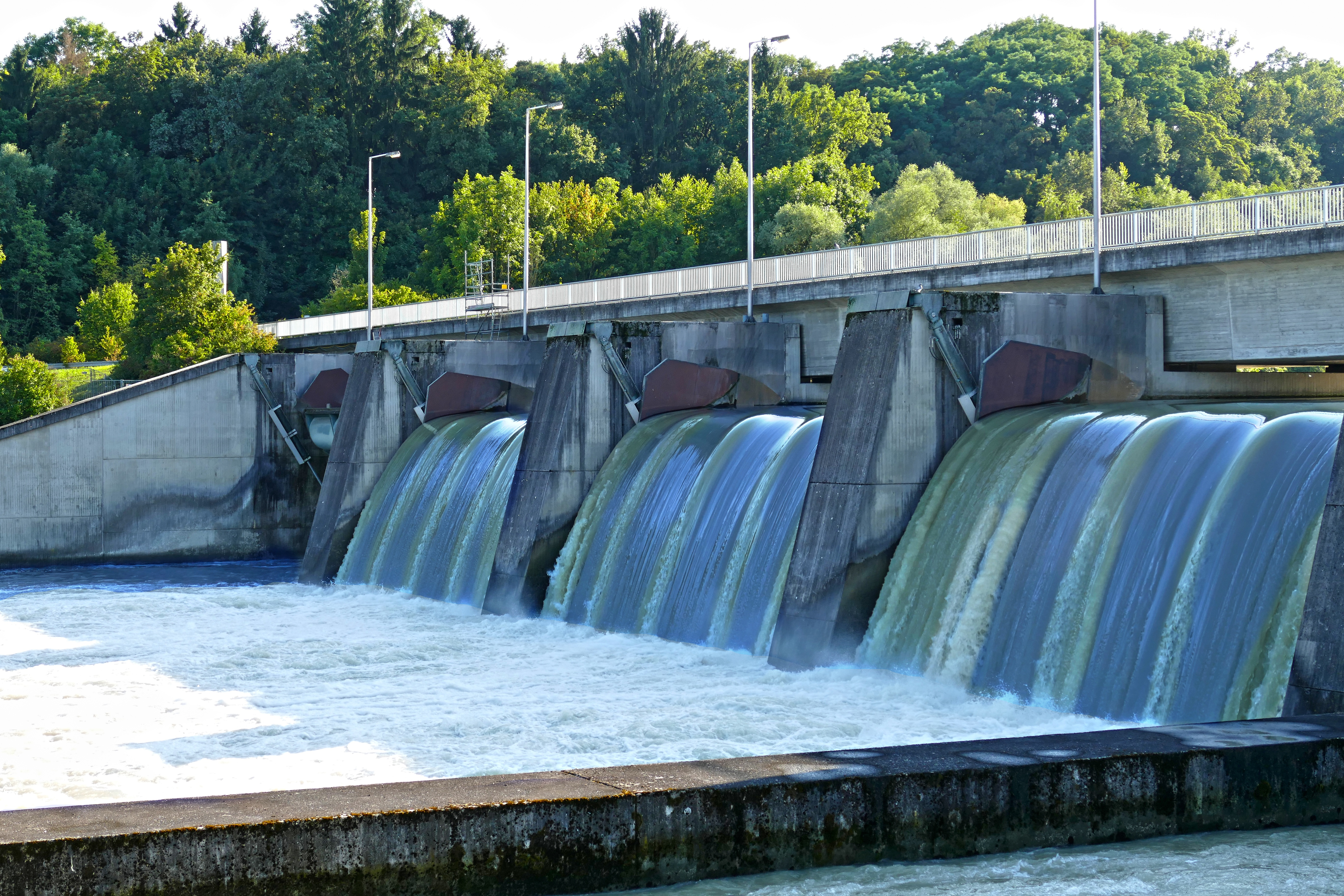
Picture of barrage dam

Barrage dams have a series of gates that control the amount of water passing through. A barrage dam can be used to divert water for irrigation needs or limit the amount of water downstream. In most cases, a barrage dam is built near the mouth of the river. The site of dam construction needs to be thoroughly investigated to ensure that the foundation is strong enough to support the dam and has low possibility of failing. When dams are created, they are given a safety rating depending on the type of dam, location, and the possible effects in case of failure. The ratings are from one to five, five having the highest danger rating. The rating of five would be given to dams built with a town or city downstream, which would have higher possibility of injury to people in the case of dam failure. New designs have been made that are able to sustain greater amounts of water. An improved wedge-shaped block technology was developed by Rafael Morán and Miguel Toledo. The new structure is able to withstand severe flooding and uses less materials, reducing the production cost.

== Environmental impacts ==
Dam construction has several effects on the economy and the environment. Specifically, there are several ways in which the environment can be affected by dam construction. Species richness is usually measured to determine the effect of a dam on the ecosystem surrounding it. To observe the species richness, scientists collect data on the fish and animal populations before and after construction of the dam. With that data, they are able to see how the population size increased or decreased. In some cases, it was found that the species richness was less downstream from a dam compared to further upstream. Inhibiting the volume of water was shown to be detrimental to species diversity and richness. Also, at the entrance of dams, there are fewer nutrients due to the high-water flow reducing the ecosystem's reproduction standard. Along with species richness, plankton diversity can be an indicator of the ecosystem's ability to handle the newly-built dam. It has been shown that dams can have an effect on the migration of fish, leading to less reproduction. There are many small factors that can have a relatively large effect on the river ecosystems, such as species richness, water volume and nutrient levels. Different experiments have been done that looked into each of these individually and were able to determine why some dams cause such effects. While there is substantial evidence, including case studies, that points to dam construction having environmental impact, there are also studies that show less damage than expected. Looking at plankton near some dams has shown that plankton is able to continue to live through changes to its habitat. Changes such as the pH levels near dams have been recorded, and plankton was minimally affected. Other species, however, such as trout, are affected more, due to the physical dam inhibiting their migration and reproduction paths. Barrage dams control the amount of water going through them, leading to differences in the amount of water upstream and downstream from the dam. This discrepancy has different effects on different species native to the area. While there can be reduced flow downstream, there can also be problems upstream. Dams can have buildup of pressure that fish are not accustomed to, and they migrate further upstream, causing part of the river to have reduced population sizes.

== Terminology ==
According to the World Commission on Dams, a key difference between a dam and a barrage is that a dam is built for water storage in a reservoir, which raises the level of water significantly. A barrage is built for diverting water, and raises the water level by only a few feet. The latter is generally built on flat terrain across wide, often meandering rivers. Similar distinctions are used in Egypt, where it is noted: "In this system a "dam" is a structure that forms a reservoir for the storage of water during the annual flood period of the Nile in order to supplement the natural flow of the river during the low-water period; a "barrage" merely raises the river or canal level, when necessary, to the height required for adequate flow into the canals that take off above it. Barrages are usually larger than the headworks of irrigation and navigation canals, with which they are associated.

Barrages that are commonly used to dam a tidal lagoon or estuary as a method to capture tidal power from tidal flows are known as tidal barrages.

== See also ==
- Diversion dam
- Head (hydrology)
- Nampo Dam – the West Sea Barrage in North Korea
- Weir
