= Indus River =

River in Asia

Indus Sindhu, Sênggê Zangbo, Shiquan He, Mehran
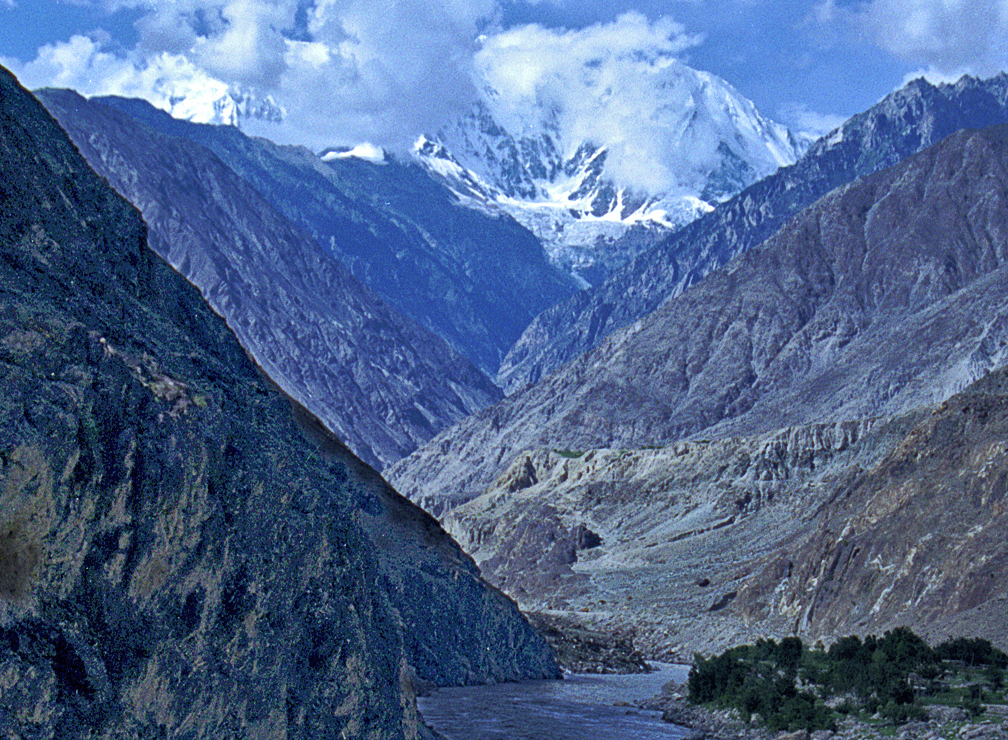
- The Indus Gorge is formed as the Indus River bends around the Nanga Parbat massif, shown towering behind, defining the western anchor of the Himalayan mountain range.

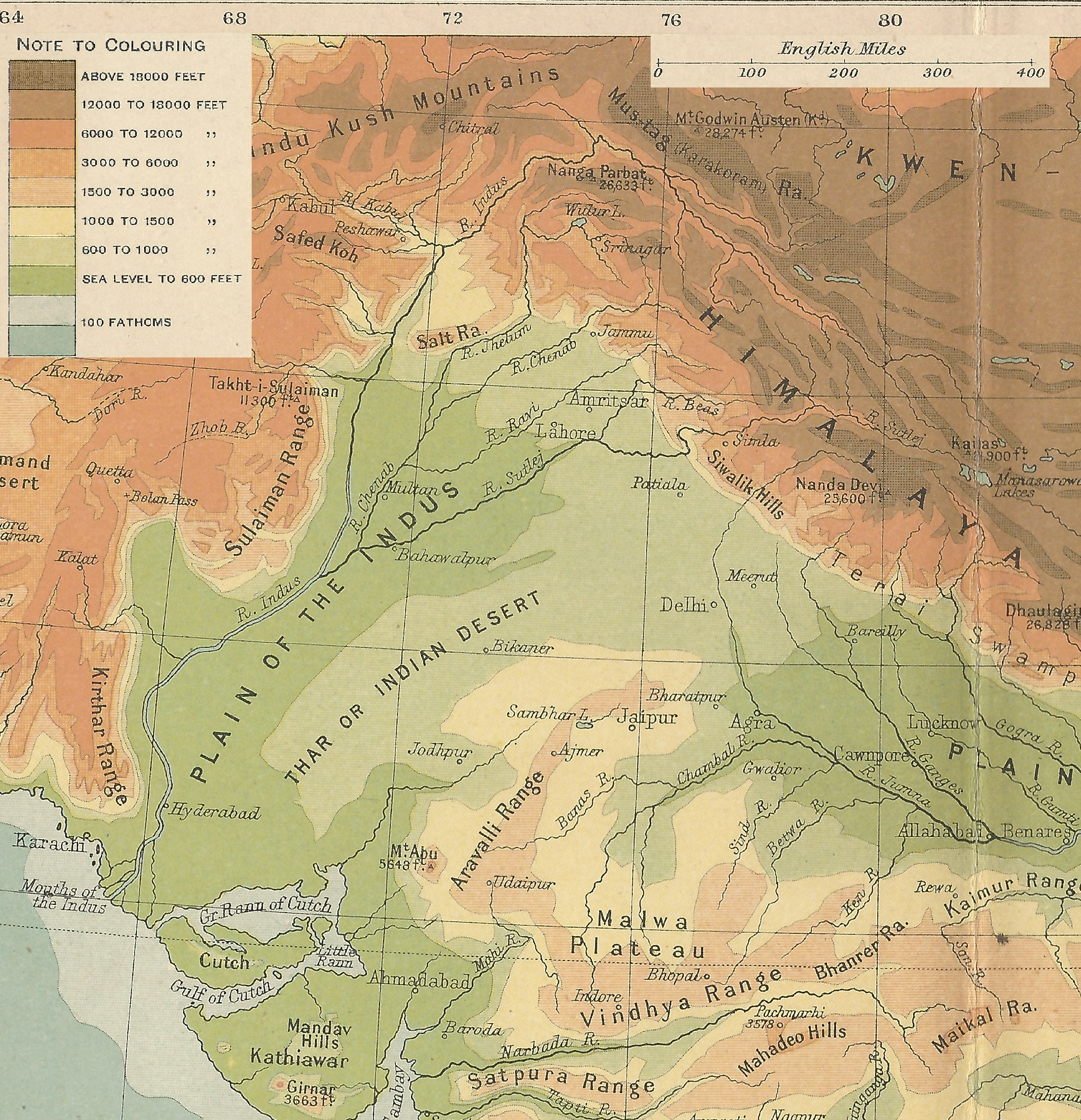
- Course and major tributaries of the Indus

Location
- Countries or regions: China, Kashmir (disputed region), Pakistan
- States, provinces or administered regions: Tibet Autonomous Region, Indian-administered Ladakh, Pakistani-administered Gilgit-Baltistan, Khyber Pakhtunkhwa, Punjab, and Sindh
- Cities: Leh, Kargil, Skardu, Dasu, Besham, Thakot, Swabi, Mianwali, Dera Ismail Khan, Bhakkar, Sukkur, Hyderabad, Karachi

Physical characteristics
- Source: Upper Gê'gyai
  - location: Ngari Prefecture
  - coordinates: 31°12′03″N 81°45′16″E
  - elevation: 5,555 m (18,225 ft)
- 2nd source: Lake Manasarovar
  - location: Ngari Prefecture
  - coordinates: 30°35′35″N 81°25′25″E
  - elevation: 4,600 m (15,100 ft)
- Source confluence
  - location: Shiquanhe (confluence), Tibet, China
  - coordinates: 32°29′54″N 79°41′28″E
  - elevation: 4,255 m (13,960 ft)
- Mouth: Arabian Sea
  - location: Indus River Delta
  - coordinates: 23°59′42″N 67°26′06″E
  - elevation: 0 m (0 ft)
- Length: 3,180 km (1,980 mi)
- Basin size: 1,120,000 km^{2} (430,000 mi^{2})
- Discharge
  - location: Indus River Delta
  - average: 5,533 m^{3}/s (195,400 cu ft/s)
  - minimum: 1,200 m^{3}/s (42,000 cu ft/s)
  - maximum: 58,000 m^{3}/s (2,000,000 cu ft/s)
- Discharge
  - location: Mithankot
  - average: (Period: 1971–2000)5,812.3 m^{3}/s (205,260 cu ft/s)
- Discharge
  - location: Tarbela Dam
  - average: (Period: 1971–2000)2,469 m^{3}/s (87,200 cu ft/s)
- Discharge
  - location: Kachura
  - average: (Period: 1981–2010)1,192 m^{3}/s (42,100 cu ft/s)
- Discharge
  - location: Kharmong
  - average: (Period: 1983–2010)453 m^{3}/s (16,000 cu ft/s)

Basin features
- Progression: Arabian Sea
- River system: Indus River
- Tributaries
  - left: Zanskar, Suru, Soan, Panjnad, Ghaggar
  - right: Shyok, Hunza, Gilgit, Swat, Kunar, Kabul, Kurram, Gomal, Zhob

The Indus (/ˈɪndəs/ IN-dəs) is a transboundary river of Asia and a trans-Himalayan river of South and Central Asia. The 3,180 km (1,980 mi) river rises in the Tibet Autonomous Region of China where it is known as Sengge Zangbo, flows northwest through the disputed Kashmir region, first through the Indian-administered Ladakh, and then the Pakistani-administered Gilgit-Baltistan, (Note: For about 200 miles (320 km) it flows northwest, crossing the southeastern boundary of the disputed Kashmir region at about 15,000 feet (4,600 meters). A short way beyond Leh, in the Indian-administered union territory of Ladakh, it is joined on its left by its first major tributary, the Zanskar River. Continuing for 150 miles (240 km) in the same direction into the Pakistani-administered areas of the Kashmir region, the Indus is joined by its notable tributary the Shyok River on the right bank.) bends sharply to the left after the Nanga Parbat massif, and flows south-by-southwest through several provinces of Pakistan, before bifurcating and emptying into the Arabian Sea, its main stem located near the port city of Karachi.

The Indus River has a total drainage area of circa 1,120,000 km^{2} (430,000 mi^{2}). Its estimated annual flow is around 175 km^{3}/a (5,500 m^{3}/s), making it one of the 50 largest rivers in the world in terms of average annual flow. Its left-bank tributary in Ladakh is the Zanskar River, and its left-bank tributary in the plains is the Panjnad River which is formed by the successive confluences of the five Punjab rivers, namely the Chenab, Jhelum, Ravi, Beas, and Sutlej rivers. Its principal right-bank tributaries are the Shyok, Gilgit, Kabul, Kurram, and Gomal rivers. Beginning in a mountain spring and fed with glaciers and rivers in the Himalayan, Karakoram, and Hindu Kush ranges, the river supports the ecosystems of temperate forests, plains, and arid countryside.

Geologically, the headwaters of the Indus and to their east those of the Yarlung Tsangpo (later in its course, the Brahmaputra) flow along the Indus-Yarlung suture zone, which defines the boundary along which the Indian plate collided with the Eurasian plate in the Early Eocene (approximately 50 Million years ago). These two Eurasian rivers, whose courses were continually diverted by the rising Himalayas, define the western and eastern limits, respectively, of the mountain range. After the Indus debouches from its narrow Himalayan valley, it forms, along with its tributaries, the Punjab region of South Asia. The lower course of the river ends in a large delta.

Historically, the Indus was important to many cultures. The 3rd millennium BC saw the rise of Indus Valley Civilisation, a major urban civilization of the Bronze Age. During the 2nd millennium BC, the Punjab region was mentioned in the Rigveda hymns as Sapta Sindhu and in the Avesta religious texts as Hapta Həndu (both terms mean "seven rivers"). Early historical kingdoms that arose in the Indus Valley include Gandhāra and Sindhu-Sauvīra. The Indus River came into the knowledge of the Western world early in the classical period, when King Darius of Persia sent his Greek subject Scylax of Caryanda to explore the river, c. 515 BC.

== Etymology and names ==
The English language word "Indus" comes from Late Latin Indus (1598), specifically a use of Classical Latin Indus (inhabitant of India, Indian) from ancient Greek Ἰνδός "inhabitant of India, Indian, the River Indus", in turn from Old Persian Hindu, denoting an eastern province of the Achaemenid Empire (hind India, see Hinduš), and Avestan hiṇdu, həṇdu "river"; with the same Proto Indo-Iranian-root as Sanskrit sindhu (IPA: [sin̪d̪ʰu], river); hence also the region of the Indus, from which also derive Hellenistic Greek Σίνθος "the River Indus" and Hindustan "land of the river Indus." The river's traditional name in Sanskrit and Tibetan is "Sindhu". In Sanskrit, its range of meanings includes: stream, river; Indus; flood; sea or ocean; region or country in the vicinity of the Indus, Sindh, people of Sindh."

The modern Urdu name is Sindh or Daryā-i-Sindh, in contrast to the province of Sindh (Subah-i-Sindh). The Ladakhis and Tibetans call the river Senge Tsangpo.

== Description ==
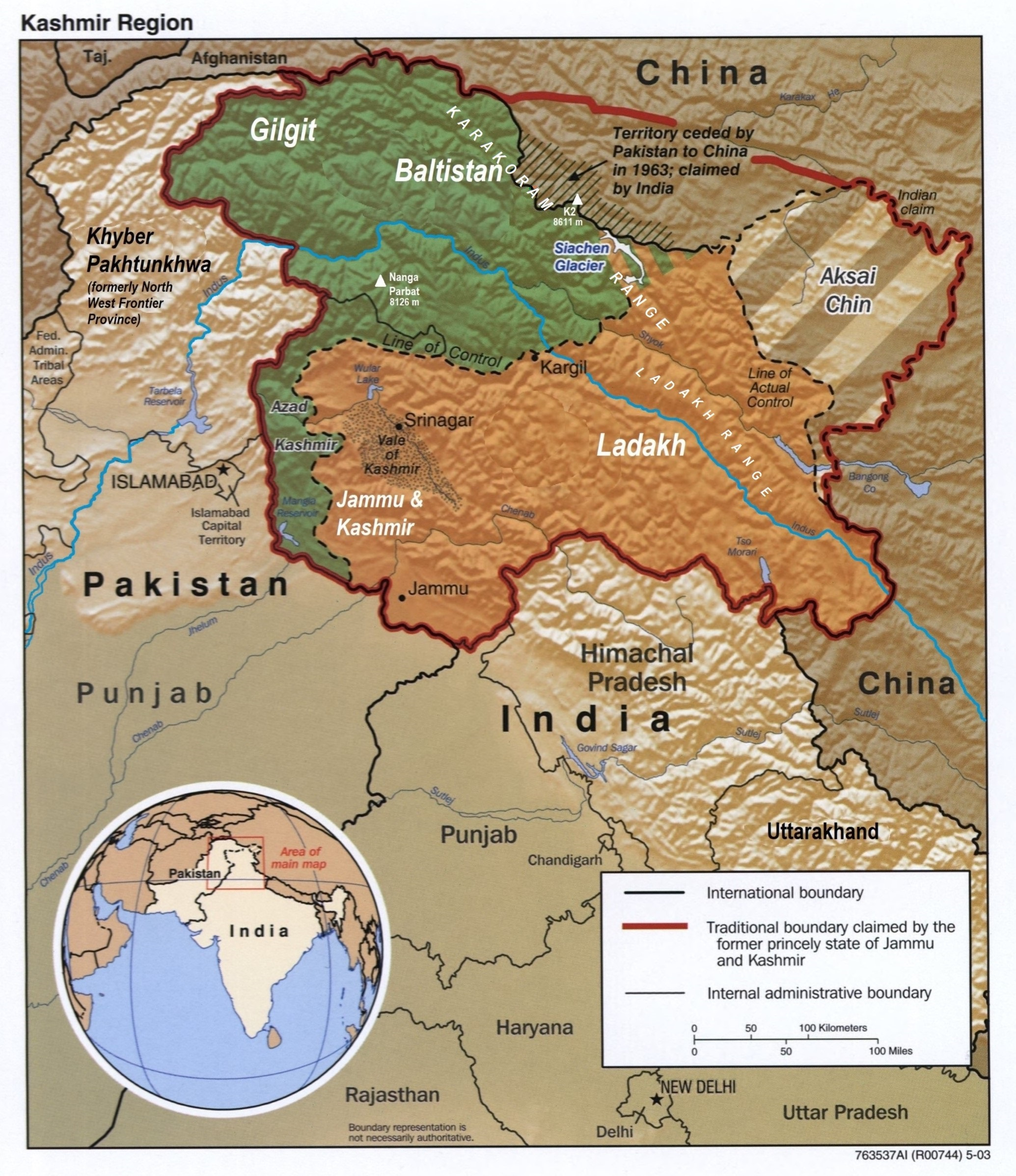
The course of the Indus in the disputed Kashmir region; the river flows through Ladakh and Gilgit-Baltistan, administered respectively by India and Pakistan

The Indus River provides key water resources for the Pakistani economy – especially the breadbasket of Punjab province, which accounts for most of the nation's agricultural production. The word Punjab means "land of five rivers" and the five rivers are Jhelum, Chenab, Ravi, Beas and Sutlej, all of which finally flow into the Indus. The Indus also supports many heavy industries and provides the main supply of potable water in Pakistan.

The total length of the river varies in different sources. The length used in this article is 3,180 km (1,980 mi), taken from the Himalayan Climate and Water Atlas (2015). Historically, the 1909 The Imperial Gazetteer of India gave it as "just over 1,800 miles". A shorter figure of 2,880 km (1,790 mi) has been widely used in modern sources, as has the one of 3,180 km (1,980 mi). The modern Encyclopedia Britannica was originally published in 1999 with the shorter measurement, but was updated in 2015 to use the longer measurement. Both lengths are commonly found in modern publications; in some cases, both measurements can be found within the same work. An extended figure of circa 3,600 km (2,200 mi) was announced by a Chinese research group in 2011, based on a comprehensive remeasurement from satellite imagery, and a ground expedition to identify an alternative source point, but detailed analysis has not yet been published.

The ultimate source of the Indus is in Tibet, but there is some debate about the exact source. The traditional source of the river is the Sênggê Kanbab (Sênggê Zangbo) or "Lion's Mouth", a perennial spring not far from the sacred Mount Kailash, marked by a long low line of Tibetan chortens. There are several other tributaries nearby, which may form a longer stream than Sênggê Kanbab, but unlike the Sênggê Kanbab, are all dependent on snowmelt. The Zanskar River, which flows into the Indus in Ladakh, has a greater volume of water than the Indus itself before that point. An alternative reckoning begins the river around 300 km further upstream, at the confluence of the Sênggê Zangbo and Gar Tsangpo rivers, which drain the Nganglong Kangri and Gangdise Shan (Gang Rinpoche, Mt. Kailash) mountain ranges. The 2011 remeasurement suggested the source was a small lake northeast of Mount Kailash, rather than either of the two points previously used.

The Indus then flows northwest through Ladakh (Indian-administered Kashmir) and Baltistan and Gilgit (Pakistan-administered Kashmir), just south of the Karakoram range. The Shyok, Shigar and Gilgit rivers carry glacial waters into the main river. It gradually bends to the south and descends into the Punjab plains at Kalabagh, Pakistan. The Indus passes gigantic Indus Gorge 4,500–5,200 metres (15,000–17,000 ft) deep near the Nanga Parbat massif. It flows swiftly across Hazara and is dammed at the Tarbela Reservoir. The Kabul River joins it near Attock. The remainder of its route to the sea is in the plains of the Punjab and Sindh, where the flow of the river becomes slow and highly braided. It is joined by the Panjnad at Mithankot. Beyond this confluence, the river, at one time, was named the Satnad River (sat = "seven", nadī = "river"), as the river now carried the waters of the Kabul River, the Indus River and the five Punjab rivers. When the river passes Jamshoro, it ends in a large delta to the South of Thatta in the Sindh province of Pakistan.

The Indus is one of the few rivers in the world to exhibit a tidal bore. The Indus system is largely fed by the snow and glaciers of the Himalayas, Karakoram and the Hindu Kush ranges. The flow of the river is also determined by the seasons—it diminishes greatly in the winter while flooding its banks in the monsoon months from July to September. There is also evidence of a steady shift in the course of the river since prehistoric times—it deviated westwards from flowing into the Rann of Kutch and adjoining Banni grasslands after the 1816 earthquake. As of 2011, Indus water flows into the Rann of Kutch during its floods breaching flood banks.

== History ==
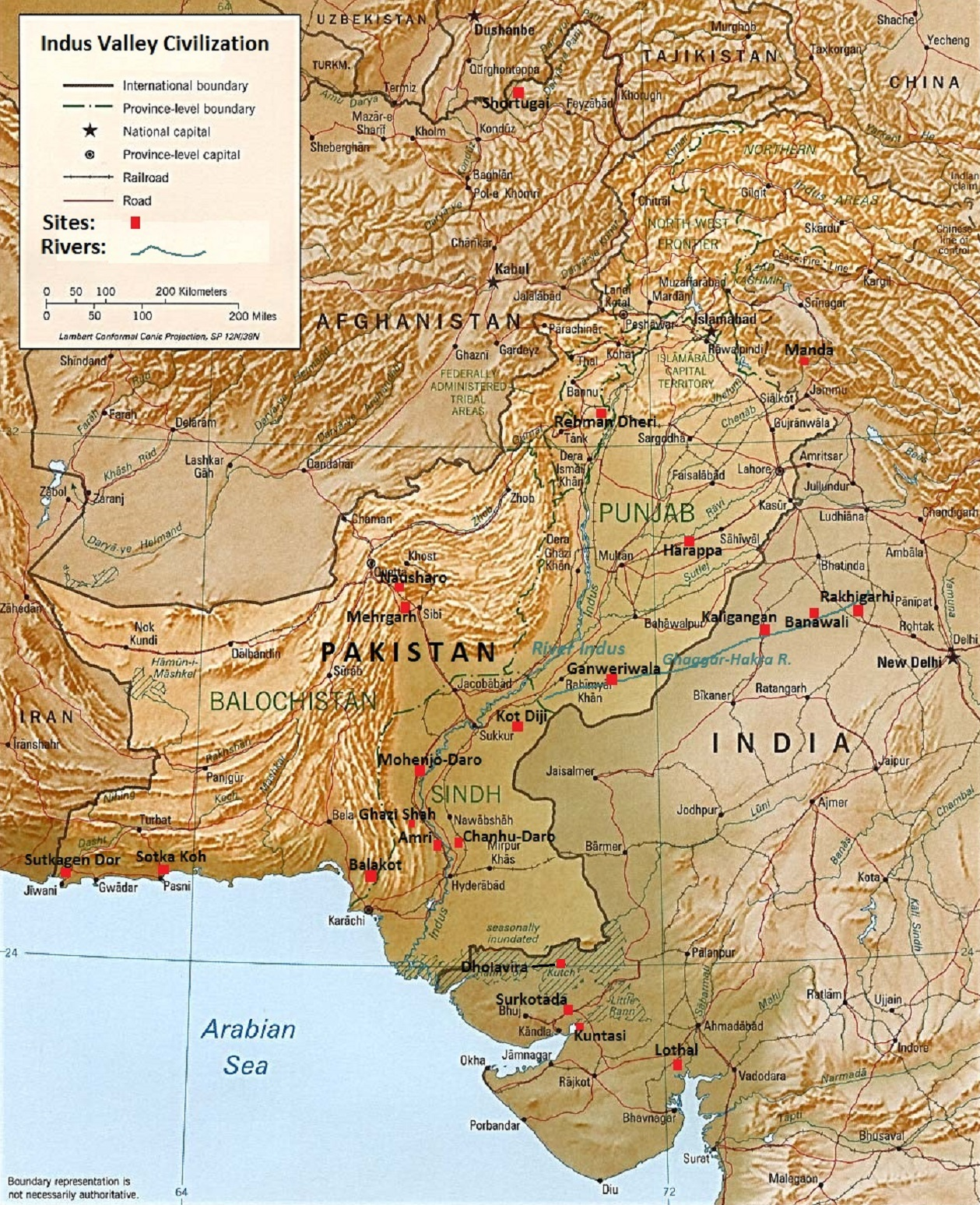
The major sites of the Indus Valley Civilization c. 2600–1900 BC in Pakistan, India and Afghanistan

The major cities of the Indus Valley Civilisation, such as Harappa and Mohenjo-daro, date back to around 3300 BC, and represent some of the largest human habitations of the ancient world. The Indus Valley Civilisation extended from across northeast Afghanistan to Pakistan and northwest India, with an upward reach from east of the Jhelum River to Ropar on the upper Sutlej. The coastal settlements extended from Sutkagan Dor at the Pakistan-Iran border to Kutch in modern Gujarat, India. There is an Indus site on the Amu Darya at Shortughai in northern Afghanistan, and the Indus site Alamgirpur at the Hindon River is located only 28 km (17 mi) from Delhi. To date, over 1,052 cities and settlements have been found, mainly in the general region of the Ghaggar-Hakra River and its tributaries. Among the settlements were the major urban centres of Harappa and Mohenjo-daro, as well as Lothal, Dholavira, Ganeriwala, and Rakhigarhi. Only 40 Indus Valley sites have been discovered on the Indus and its tributaries. However, it is notable that majority of the Indus script seals and inscribed objects discovered were found at sites along the Indus river. (Note: Number of Indus script inscribed objects and seals obtained from various Harappan sites: 1540 from Mohanjodaro, 985 from Harappa, 66 from Chanhudaro, 165 from Lothal, 99 from Kalibangan, 7 from Banawali, 6 from Ur in Iraq, 5 from Surkotada, 4 from Chandigarh)

Some scholars believe that settlements of Gandhara grave culture of the early Indo-Aryans flourished in Gandhara from 1700 BC to 600 BC, when Mohenjo-daro and Harappa had already been abandoned.

The Rigveda describes several rivers, including one named "Sindhu". The Rigvedic "Sindhu" is thought to be the present-day Indus River. It is attested 176 times in its text, 94 times in the plural, and most often used in the generic sense of "river". In the Rigveda, notably in the later hymns, the meaning of the word is narrowed to refer to the Indus River in particular; for example, in the list of rivers mentioned in the hymn of Nadistuti sukta. The Rigvedic hymns apply a feminine gender to all the rivers mentioned therein, except for the Brahmaputra.

The word "India" is derived from the Indus River. In ancient times, "India" initially referred to those regions immediately along the east bank of the Indus, where Punjab and Sindh are now but by 300 BC, Greek writers including Herodotus and Megasthenes were applying the term to the entire subcontinent that extends much farther eastward.

The lower basin of the Indus forms a natural boundary between the Iranian Plateau and the Indian subcontinent; this region embraces all or parts of the Pakistani provinces Balochistan, Khyber Pakhtunkhwa, Punjab and Sindh and the countries Afghanistan and India. The first West Eurasian empire to annex the Indus Valley was the Persian Empire, during the reign of Darius the Great. During his reign, the Greek explorer Scylax of Caryanda was commissioned to explore the course of the Indus. It was crossed by the invading armies of Alexander. Still, after his Macedonians conquered the west bank—joining it to the Hellenic world, they elected to retreat along the southern course of the river, ending Alexander's Asian campaign. Alexander's admiral Nearchus set out from the Indus Delta to explore the Persian Gulf, until reaching the Tigris. The Indus Valley was later dominated by the Mauryan and Kushan Empires, Indo-Greek Kingdoms, Indo-Scythians and Hepthalites. Over several centuries Muslim armies of Muhammad ibn al-Qasim, Mahmud of Ghazni, Muhammad of Ghor, Timur and Babur crossed the river to invade Sindh and Punjab, providing a gateway to the Indian subcontinent.

== Geology ==
The Indus River in the foreground and the Nanga Parbat peak, the western syntaxis of the Himalayas, far in the background, a little faint but towering well above the cloud layer (Note: as seen from a plane approximately above the historic Sawal Dher village, in Khyber Pakhtunkhwa, Pakistan)

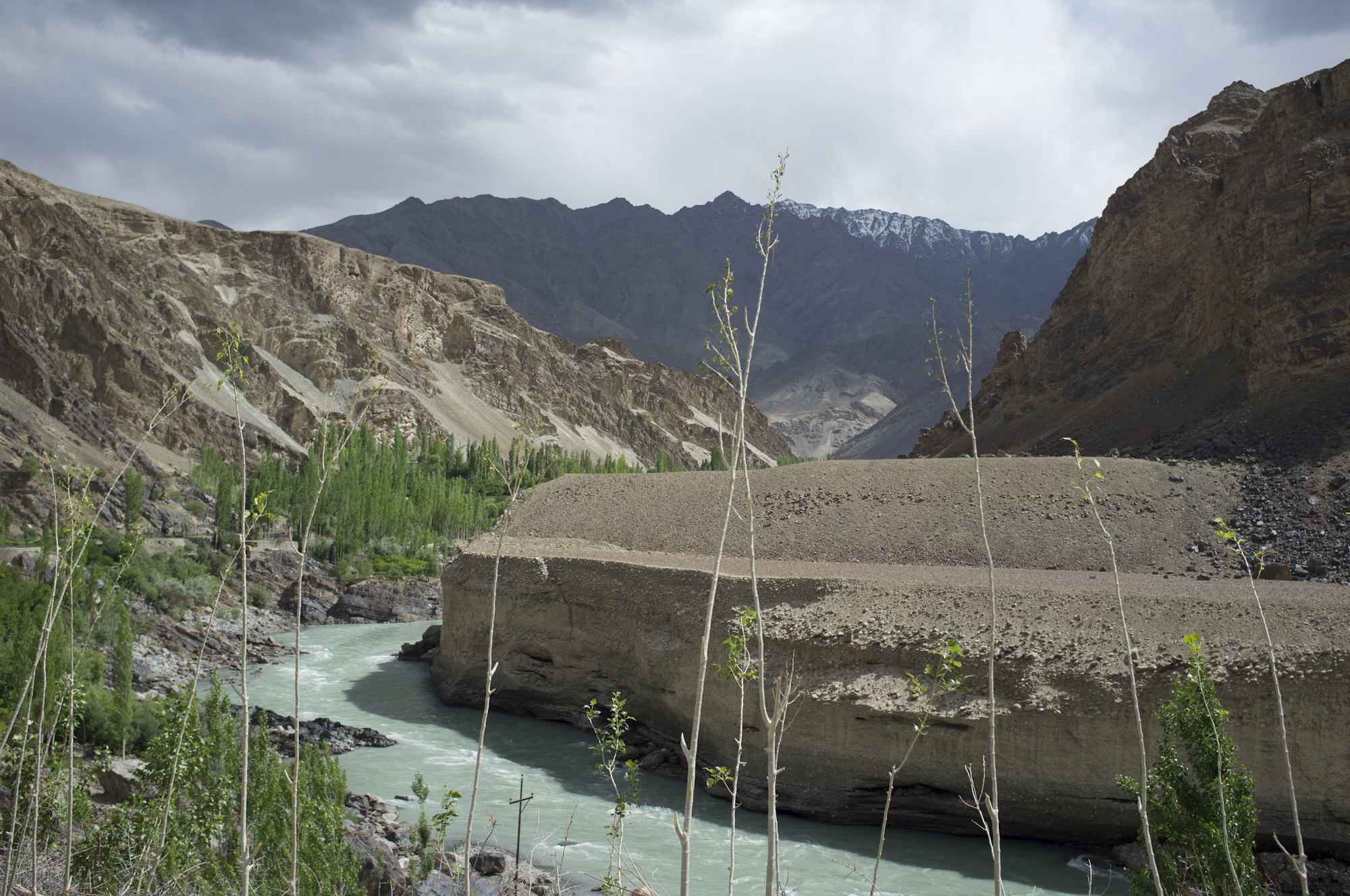
Indus River near Leh, Ladakh

The Indus River is an antecedent river, meaning that it existed before the Himalayas and entrenched itself while they were rising.

The Indus River feeds the Indus submarine fan, which is the second largest sediment body on Earth. It consists of around 5 million cubic kilometers of material eroded from the mountains. Studies of the sediment in the modern river indicate that the Karakoram Mountains in northern Pakistan and India are the single most important source of material, with the Himalayas providing the next largest contribution, mostly via the large rivers of the Punjab (Jhelum, Ravi, Chenab, Beas and Sutlej). Analysis of sediments from the Arabian Sea has demonstrated that five million years ago the Indus was not connected to these Punjab rivers which instead flowed east into the Ganga and were captured after that time. Earlier work showed that sand and silt from western Tibet was reaching the Arabian Sea by 45 million years ago, implying the existence of an ancient Indus River by that time. The delta of this proto-Indus River has subsequently been found in the Katawaz Basin, on the Pak–Afghan border.

In the Nanga Parbat region, the massive amounts of erosion due to the Indus River following the capture and rerouting through that area are thought to bring middle and lower crustal rocks to the surface.

In November 2011, satellite images showed that the Indus River had re-entered India and was feeding the Great Rann of Kutch, Little Rann of Kutch and a lake near Ahmedabad known as Nal Sarovar. Heavy rains had left the river basin along with the Lake Manchar, Lake Hemal and Kalri Lake (all in modern-day Pakistan) inundated. This happened two centuries after the Indus River shifted its course westwards following the 1819 Rann of Kutch earthquake.

The Induan Age at the start of the Triassic Period of geological time is named for the Indus region.

=== Tributaries ===
* Gar River
- Gilgit River
  - Hunza River
- Gomal River
  - Zhob River
- Haro River
- Kabul River
  - Swat River
  - Chitral River (or Kunar River)
- Kurram River
- Panjnad River
  - Chenab River
    - Jhelum River
    - Ravi River
  - Satluj River
    - Beas River
- Shyok River
- Soan River
- Dras River (or Shingo River)
- Zanskar River
- Luni River
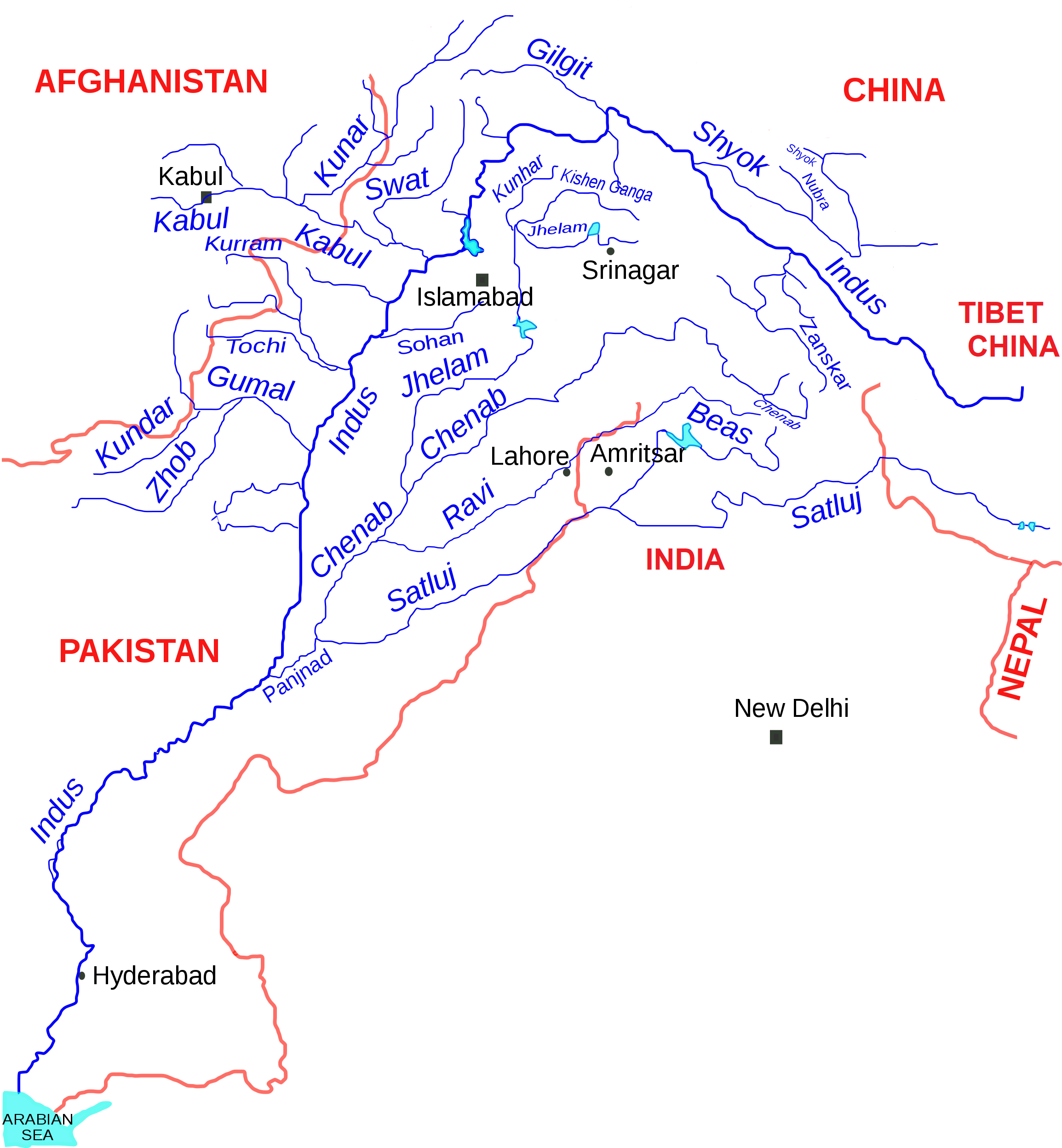
Indus River basin

== Wildlife ==
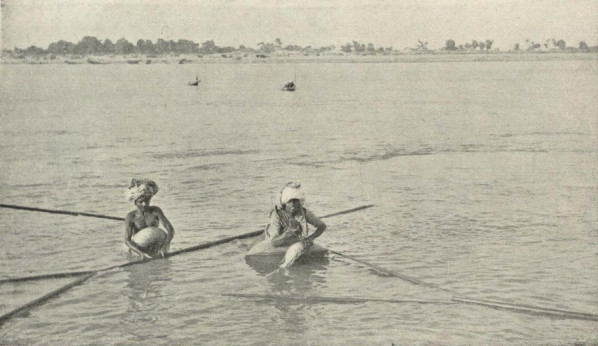
Fishermen on the Indus River, c. 1905

Accounts of the Indus Valley from the times of Alexander's campaign indicate a healthy forest cover in the region. The Mughal emperor Babur writes of encountering rhinoceroses along its bank in his memoirs (the Baburnama). Extensive deforestation and human interference in the ecology of the Shivalik Hills has led to a marked deterioration in vegetation and growing conditions. The Indus Valley regions are arid with poor vegetation. Agriculture is sustained largely due to irrigation works. The Indus River and its watershed have a rich biodiversity. It is home to around 25 amphibian species.

=== Mammals ===
The Indus River dolphin (Platanista indicus minor) is found only in the Indus River. It is a species of the South Asian river dolphin. The Indus River dolphin formerly also occurred in the tributaries of the Indus River. According to the World Wildlife Fund it is one of the most threatened cetaceans with only about 1,816 still existing. It is threatened by habitat degradation from the construction of dams and canals, entanglement in fishing gear, and industrial water pollution.

There are two otter species in the Indus River basin: the Eurasian otter in the northeastern highland sections and the smooth-coated otter elsewhere in the river basin. The smooth-coated otters in the Indus River represent a subspecies found nowhere else, the Sindh otter (Lutrogale perspicillata sindica).

=== Fish ===
The Indus River basin has high diversity, being the home of more than 180 freshwater fish species, including 22 which are found nowhere else. Fish also played a major role in earlier cultures of the region, including the ancient Indus Valley Civilisation where depictions of fish were frequent. The Indus script has a commonly used fish sign, which in its various forms may simply have meant "fish", or referred to stars or gods.

In the uppermost, highest part of the Indus River basin there are relatively few genera and species: Diptychus, Ptychobarbus, Schizopyge, Schizopygopsis and Schizothorax snowtrout, Triplophysa loaches, and the catfish Glyptosternon reticulatum. Going downstream these are soon joined by the golden mahseer Tor putitora (alternatively T. macrolepis, although it often is regarded as a synonym of T. putitora) and Schistura loaches. Downriver from around Thakot, Tarbela, the Kabul–Indus river confluence, Attock Khurd and Peshawar the diversity rises strongly, including many cyprinids (Amblypharyngodon, Aspidoparia, Barilius, Chela, Cirrhinus, Crossocheilus, Cyprinion, Danio, Devario, Esomus, Garra, Labeo, Naziritor, Osteobrama, Pethia, Puntius, Rasbora, Salmophasia, Securicula and Systomus), true loaches (Botia and Lepidocephalus), stone loaches (Acanthocobitis and Nemacheilus), ailiid catfish (Clupisoma), bagridae catfish (Batasio, Mystus, Rita and Sperata), airsac catfish (Heteropneustes), schilbid catfish (Eutropiichthys), silurid catfish (Ompok and Wallago), sisorid catfish (Bagarius, Gagata, Glyptothorax and Sisor), gouramis (Trichogaster), nandid leaffish (Nandus), snakeheads (Channa), spiny eel (Macrognathus and Mastacembelus), knifefish (Notopterus), glassfish (Chanda and Parambassis), clupeids (Gudusia), needlefish (Xenentodon) and gobies (Glossogobius), as well as a few introduced species. As the altitude further declines the Indus basin becomes overall quite slow-flowing as it passes through the Punjab Plain. Major carp become common, and chameleonfish (Badis), mullet (Sicamugil) and swamp eel (Monopterus) appear. In some upland lakes and tributaries of the Punjab region snow trout and mahseer are still common, but once the Indus basin reaches its lower plain the former group is absent and the latter are rare. Many of the species of the middle sections of the Indus basin are also present in the lower. Notable examples of genera that are present in the lower plain but generally not elsewhere in the Indus River basin are the Aphanius pupfish, Aplocheilus killifish, palla fish (Tenualosa ilisha), catla (Labeo catla), rohu (Labeo rohita) and Cirrhinus mrigala. The lowermost part of the river and its delta are home to freshwater fish, but also several brackish and marine species. This includes pomfret and prawns. The large delta has been recognized by conservationists as an important ecological region. Here, the river turns into many marshes, streams and creeks and meets the sea at shallow levels.

Palla fish (Tenualosa ilisha) of the river is a delicacy for people living along the river. The population of fish in the river is moderately high, with Sukkur, Thatta, and Kotri being the major fishing centres—all in the lower Sindh course. As a result, damming and irrigation have made fish farming an important economic activity.

== Economy ==
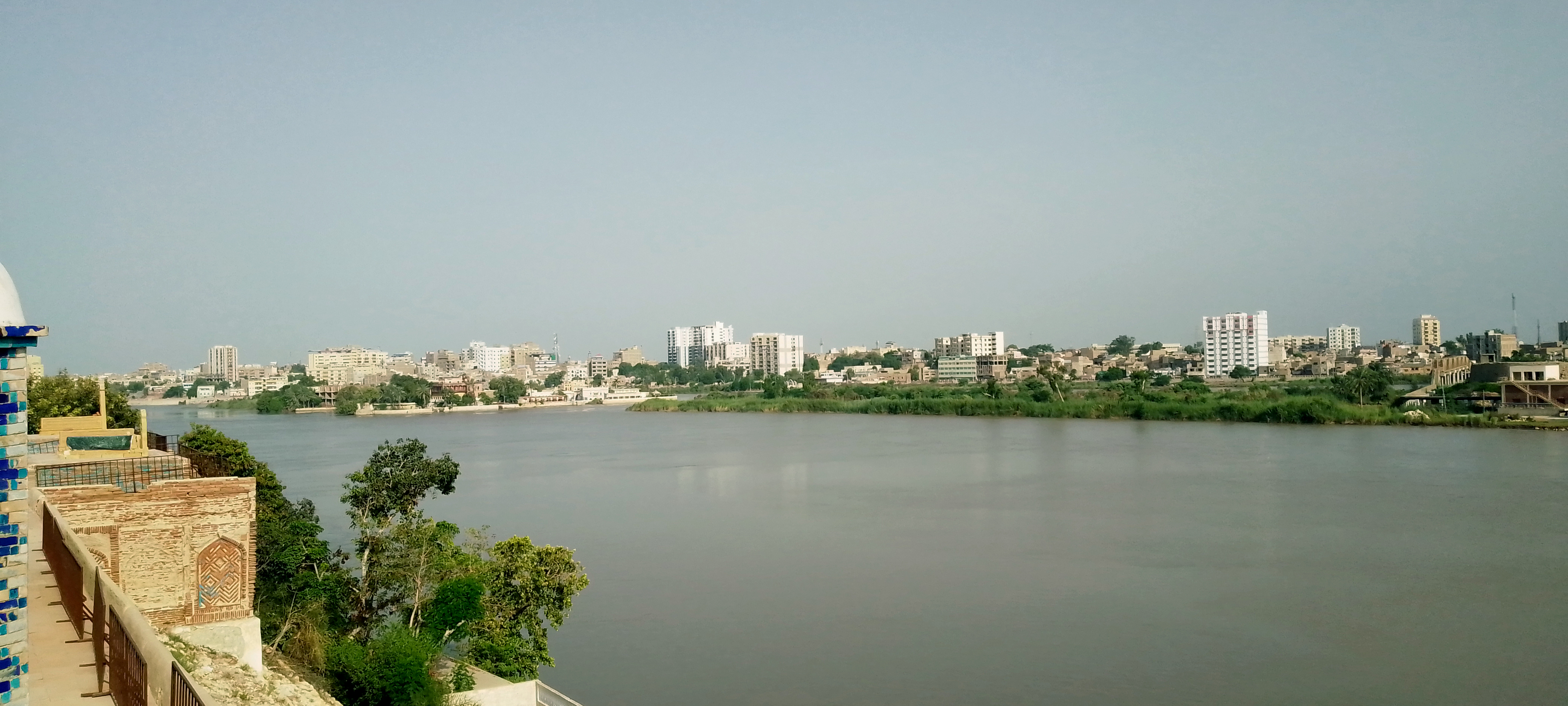
Skyline of Sukkur along the shores of the Indus River

The Indus is the most important supplier of water resources to the Punjab and Sindh plains—it forms the backbone of agriculture and food production in Pakistan. The river is especially critical since rainfall is meagre in the lower Indus valley. Irrigation canals were first built by the people of the Indus Valley Civilisation, and later by the engineers of the Kushan Empire and the Mughal Empire. Modern irrigation was introduced by the British East India Company in 1850—the construction of modern canals accompanied with the restoration of old canals. The British supervised the construction of one of the most complex irrigation networks in the world. The Guddu Barrage is 1,350 m (4,430 ft) long—irrigating Sukkur, Jacobabad, Larkana and Kalat. The Sukkur Barrage serves over 20,000 km^{2} (7,700 sq mi).

After Pakistan came into existence, a water control treaty signed between India and Pakistan in 1960 guaranteed that Pakistan would receive water from the Indus River and its two tributaries the Jhelum River and the Chenab River independently of upstream control by India.

The Indus Basin Project consisted primarily of the construction of two main dams, the Mangla Dam built on the Jhelum River and the Tarbela Dam constructed on the Indus River, together with their subsidiary dams. The Pakistan Water and Power Development Authority undertook the construction of the Chashma Jhelum Link Canal—linking the waters of the Indus and Jhelum rivers—extending water supplies to the regions of Bahawalpur and Multan. Pakistan constructed the Tarbela Dam near Rawalpindi—standing 2,743 metres (9,000 ft) long and 143 metres (470 ft) high, with an 80-kilometre (50 mi) long reservoir. It supports the Chashma Barrage near Dera Ismail Khan for irrigation use and flood control and the Taunsa Barrage near Dera Ghazi Khan which also produces 100,000 kilowatts of electricity. The Kotri Barrage near Hyderabad is 915 metres (3,000 ft) long and provides additional water supplies for Karachi. The extensive linking of tributaries with the Indus has helped spread water resources to the valley of Peshawar, in Khyber Pakhtunkhwa. The extensive irrigation and dam projects provide the basis for Pakistan's large production of crops such as cotton, sugarcane and wheat. The dams also generate electricity for heavy industries and urban centres.

== People ==
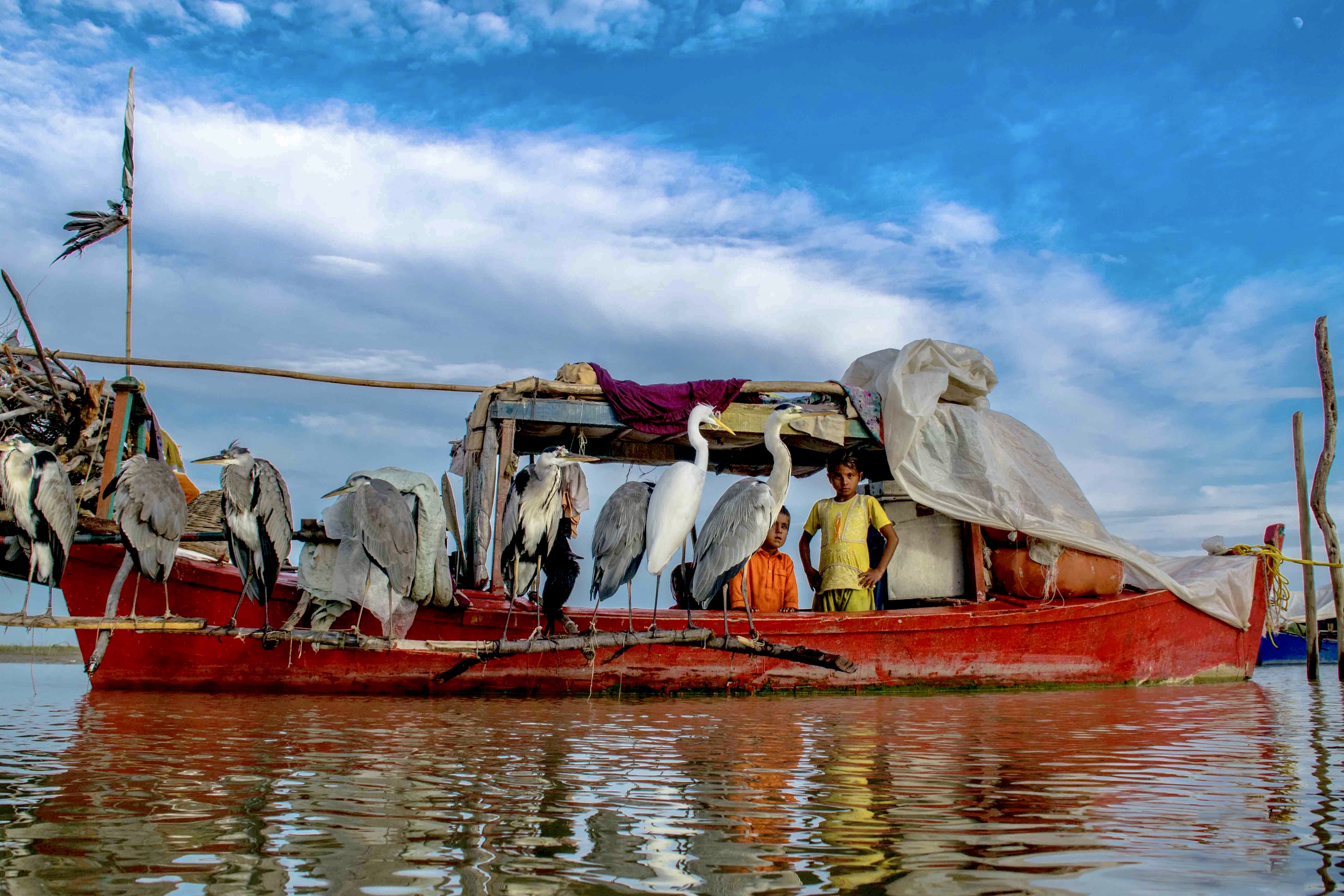
Houseboat of a Mohana family near Kot Addu; people of the Mohana tribe live on the Indus River and related waterbodies in Sindh and southern Punjab.

The Indus River is sacred to Hindus. The Sindhu Darshan Festival is held on every Guru Purnima on the banks of the Indus.

The ethnicities of the Indus Valley (Pakistan and Northwest India) have a greater amount of ANI (or West Eurasian) admixture than other South Asians, including inputs from Western Steppe Herders, with evidence of more sustained and multi-layered migrations from the west.

== Modern issues ==
=== India-Pakistan Indus water dispute ===
Indus Waters Treaty (IWT), a water-distribution treaty between India and Pakistan to use the water available in the Indus River system under which India received nearly 33 million acre⋅ft (41 billion m^{3}) (16%) while Pakistan received nearly 177 million acre⋅ft (218 billion m^{3}) (84%), was suspended by India on 23 April 2025 following a terrorist attack near Pahalgam in Kashmir, citing national security concerns. Following the suspension of the treaty, India decided to stop the flow of water on the Chenab River from the Baglihar Dam as a "short-term punitive action". It also decided to carry out reservoir flushing in order to boost the reservoir holding capacity of Salal and Baglihar projects. These actions were done off-season, in violation of the treaty provisions, without informing Pakistan. Pakistan has reportedly warned that any attempt by India to disrupt the flow of water from shared rivers could be considered an act of war, and that it could attack India with nuclear weapons.

However, India derives a military advantage from the IWT as its scope is confined to the Indus system of rivers (both eastern and western rivers) basin area located in India and only Ravi and Sutlej basins located in Pakistan per Articles II (1 to 4) and III (2 to 3) and the IWT deals only with the sharing of water available/flowing in the Indian part between Pakistan and India. As per the IWT, Pakistan bombing or destroying dams, barrages, power stations, etc. located in Indian part of the Indus system of rivers is violation of the IWT which can lead to abrogation of IWT.

=== Indus delta ===
Originally, the delta used to receive almost all of the water from the Indus River, which has an annual flow of approximately 180 billion cubic metres (240×10^{9} yd^{3}), and is accompanied by 400 million tonnes (390×10^{6} long tons) of silt. Since the 1940s, dams, barrages and irrigation works have been constructed on the river. The Indus Basin Irrigation System is the "largest contiguous irrigation system developed over the past 140 years" anywhere in the world. This has reduced the flow of water and by 2018, the average annual flow of water below the Kotri barrage was 33 billion cubic metres (43×10^{9} yd^{3}), and annual amount of silt discharged was estimated at 100 million tonnes (98×10^{6} long tons). As a result, the 2010 Pakistan floods were considered "good news" for the ecosystem and population of the river delta as they brought much-needed fresh water. Any further utilization of the river basin water is not economically feasible.

Vegetation and wildlife of the Indus delta are threatened by the reduced inflow of fresh water, along with extensive deforestation, industrial pollution and global warming. Damming has also isolated the delta population of Indus River dolphins from those further upstream.

Large-scale diversion of the river's water for irrigation has raised far-reaching issues. Sediment clogging from poor maintenance of canals has affected agricultural production and vegetation on numerous occasions. Irrigation itself is increasing soil salinization, reducing crop yields and in some cases rendering farmland useless for cultivation.

=== Effects of climate change on the river ===
The Tibetan Plateau contains the world's third-largest store of ice. Qin Dahe, the former head of the China Meteorological Administration, said the recent fast pace of melting and warmer temperatures will be good for agriculture and tourism in the short term, but issued a strong warning:

Temperatures are rising four times faster than elsewhere in China, and the Tibetan glaciers are retreating at a higher speed than in any other part of the world... In the short term, this will cause lakes to expand and bring floods and mudflows... In the long run, the glaciers are vital lifelines of the Indus River. Once they vanish, water supplies in Pakistan will be in peril.

"There is insufficient data to say what will happen to the Indus," says David Grey, the World Bank's senior water advisor in South Asia. "But we all have very nasty fears that the flows of the Indus could be severely, severely affected by glacier melt as a consequence of climate change," and reduced by perhaps as much as 50 per cent. "Now what does that mean to a population that lives in a desert [where], without the river, there would be no life? I don't know the answer to that question," he says. "But we need to be concerned about that. Deeply, deeply concerned."

U.S. diplomat Richard Holbrooke said, shortly before he died in 2010, that he believed that falling water levels in the Indus River "could very well precipitate World War III."

=== Pollution ===
Over the years factories on the banks of the Indus River have increased levels of water pollution in the river and the atmosphere around it. High levels of pollutants in the river have led to the deaths of endangered Indus River dolphin. The Sindh Environmental Protection Agency has ordered polluting factories around the river to shut down under the Pakistan Environmental Protection Act, 1997. Death of the Indus river dolphin has also been attributed to fishermen using poison to kill fish and scooping them up. As a result, the government banned fishing from Guddu Barrage to Sukkur.

The Indus is second among a group of ten rivers responsible for about 90% of all the plastic that reaches the oceans. The Yangtze is the only river contributing more plastic.

=== 2010 floods ===
Affected areas as of 26 August 2010

Frequently, Indus River is prone to moderate to severe flooding. In July 2010, following abnormally heavy monsoon rains, the Indus River rose above its banks and started flooding. The rain continued for the next two months, devastating large areas of Pakistan. In Sindh, the Indus burst its banks near Sukkur on 8 August, submerging the village of Mor Khan Jatoi. In early August, the heaviest flooding moved southward along the Indus River from severely affected northern regions toward western Punjab, where at least 1,400,000 acres (570,000 ha) of cropland was destroyed, and the southern province of Sindh. As of September 2010, over two thousand people had died and over a million homes had been destroyed since the flooding began.

=== 2011 floods ===
The 2011 Sindh floods began during the Pakistani monsoon season in mid-August 2011, resulting from heavy monsoon rains in Sindh, eastern Balochistan, and southern Punjab. The floods caused considerable damage; an estimated 434 civilians were killed, with 5.3 million people and 1,524,773 homes affected. Sindh is a fertile region and often called the "breadbasket" of the country; the damage and toll of the floods on the local agrarian economy was said to be extensive. At least 1.7 million acres (690,000 ha; 2,700 sq mi) of arable land were inundated. The flooding followed the previous year's floods, which devastated a large part of the country. Unprecedented torrential monsoon rains caused severe flooding in 16 districts of Sindh.

== Barrages, bridges, levees and dams ==
=== Tibet ===
The upper Indus in Tibet (the Senge Zangbu) is a relatively modest stream until it enters the deep gorges of the Himalayas and Karakoram. In Tibet, the Indus is exceptionally dependent on cryospheric melt (snow and glaciers meltwater) from the Karakoram and Hindu Kush ranges rather than the Tibetan plateau or monsoon rains. The Indus "gains the majority of its volume" as it moves through the Ladakh and Gilgit-Baltistan regions, where major tributaries like the Zanskar, Shyok, and Gilgit rivers join the main stem. Thus, Indus does not have major projects, with Shiquanhe (Sengge Zangbo) Hydropower Station (~6 MW run-of-the-river project) near Shiquanhe being prominent, and the Zanda Hydropower Project (0.8 MW run-of-the-river project on the Sutlej River - a major Indus tributary) in Zanda County.

=== India ===
India, on the main course of Indus, has two major barrage cum hydroelectric projects, Stakna Hydroelectric Project at Stakna near Leh (4 MW run-of-the-river project) and the Nimoo-Bazgo Dam near Alchi village (57 m tall Concrete gravity dam with 52.82 million m^{3} Gross capacity and 1.12 million m^{3} Live capacity generating 45 MW electricity).

=== Pakistan ===
In Pakistan currently there are six barrages on the Indus: Guddu Barrage, Sukkur Barrage, Kotri Barrage (also called Ghulam Muhammad barrage), Taunsa Barrage, Chashma Barrage and Jinnah Barrage. Another new barrage called "Sindh Barrage" is planned as a terminal barrage on the Indus River. There are some bridges on River Indus, such as Dadu Moro Bridge, Larkana Khairpur Indus River Bridge, Thatta-Sujawal bridge, Jhirk-Mula Katiar bridge and recently planned Kandhkot-Ghotki bridge.

The entire left bank of the Indus River in Sind province is protected from river flooding by constructing around 600 km long levees. The right bank side is also leveed from Guddu barrage to Lake Manchar. In response to the levees construction, the river has been aggrading rapidly over the last 20 years leading to breaches upstream of barrages and inundation of large areas.

Tarbela Dam in Pakistan is constructed on the Indus River, while the controversial Kalabagh dam has also been proposed on Indus River. Pakistan is also building Munda Dam on Swat River.

=== Gallery ===
Video of River Indus at Kotri Barrage, Sindh, Pakistan.

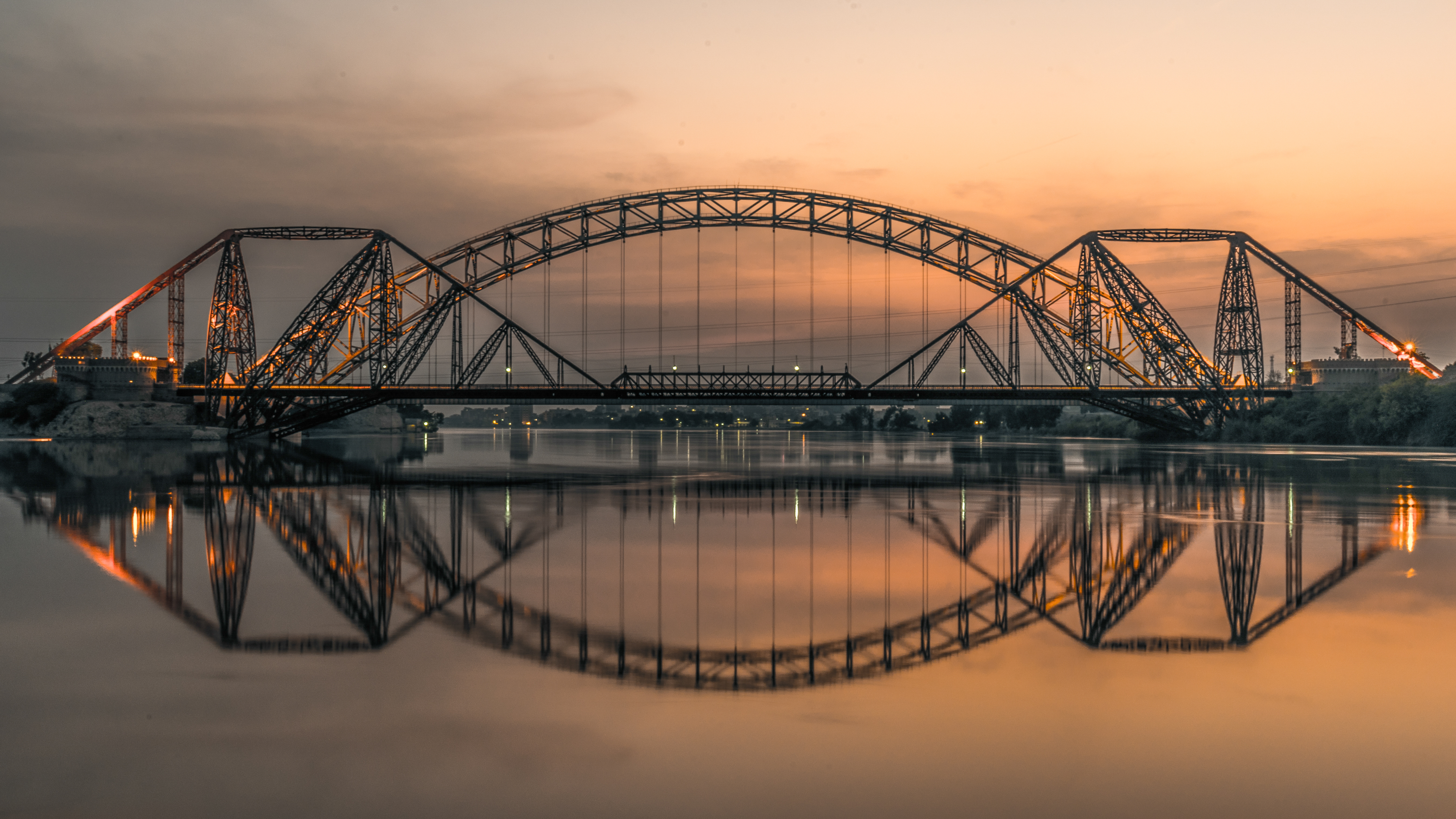
Lansdowne Bridge and Ayub Bridge connecting the cities of Rohri and Sukkur in Sindh, Pakistan.

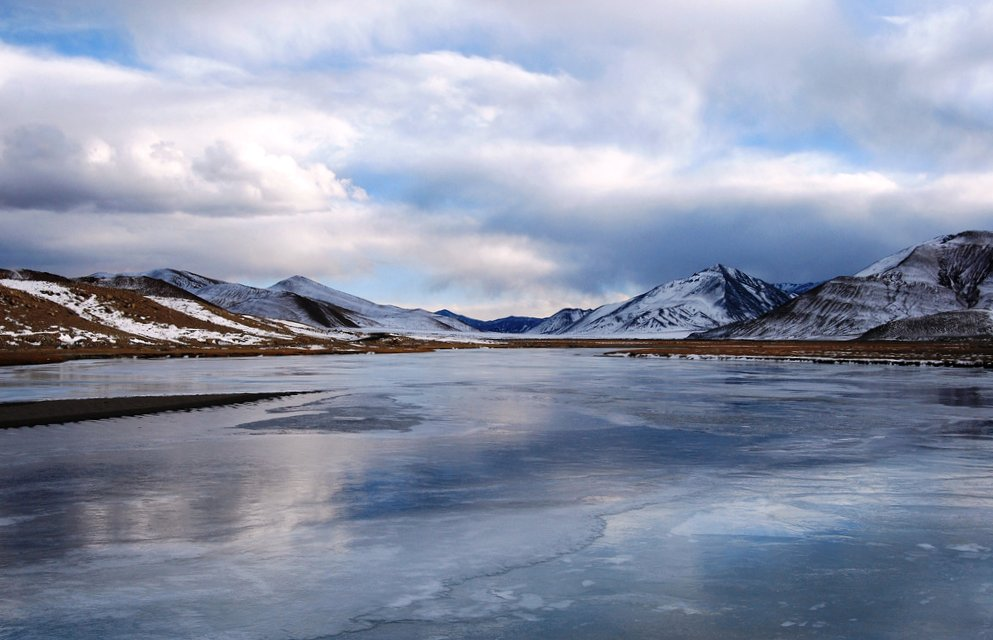
Frozen Indus, Near Nyoma

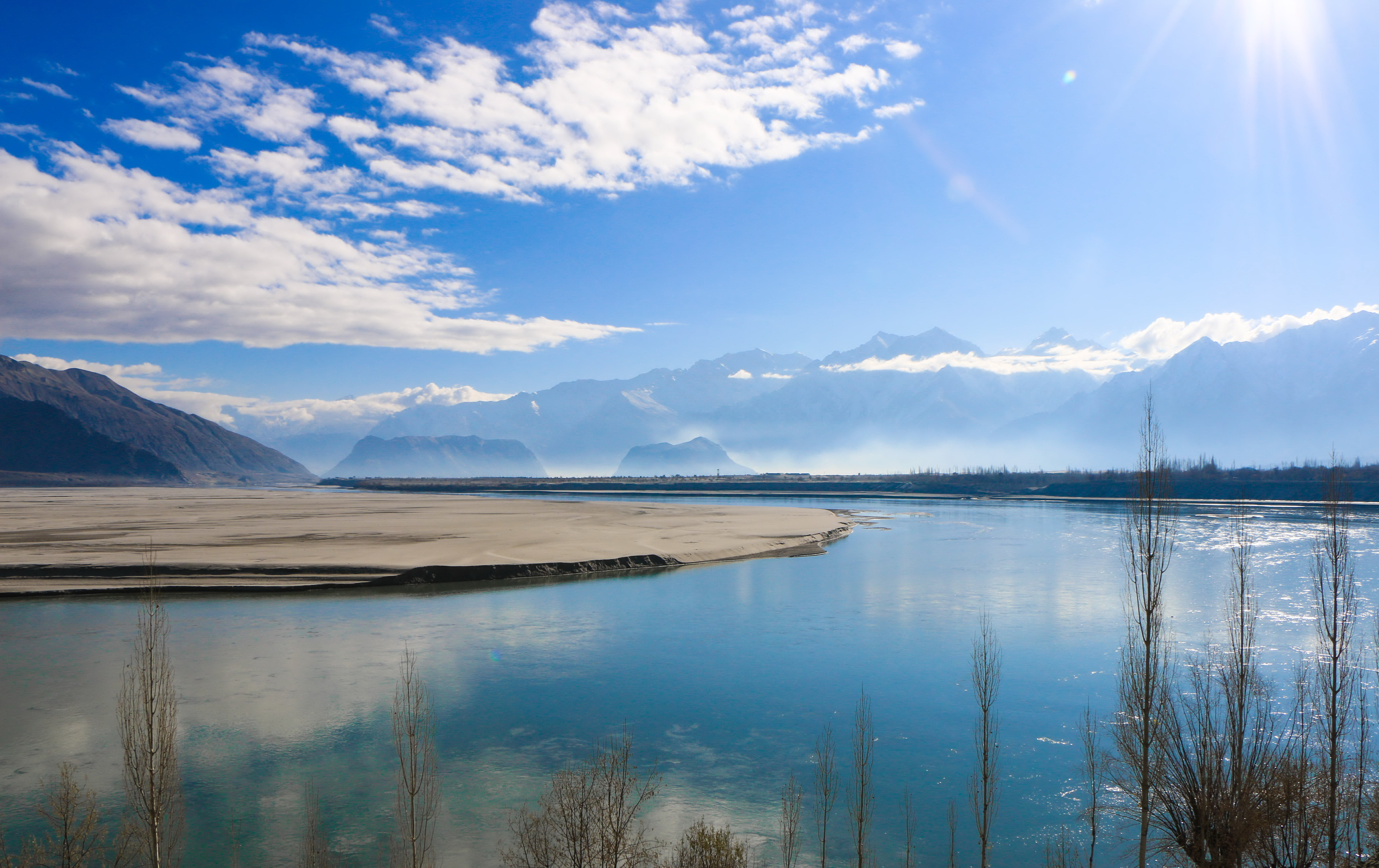
Indus at Skardu

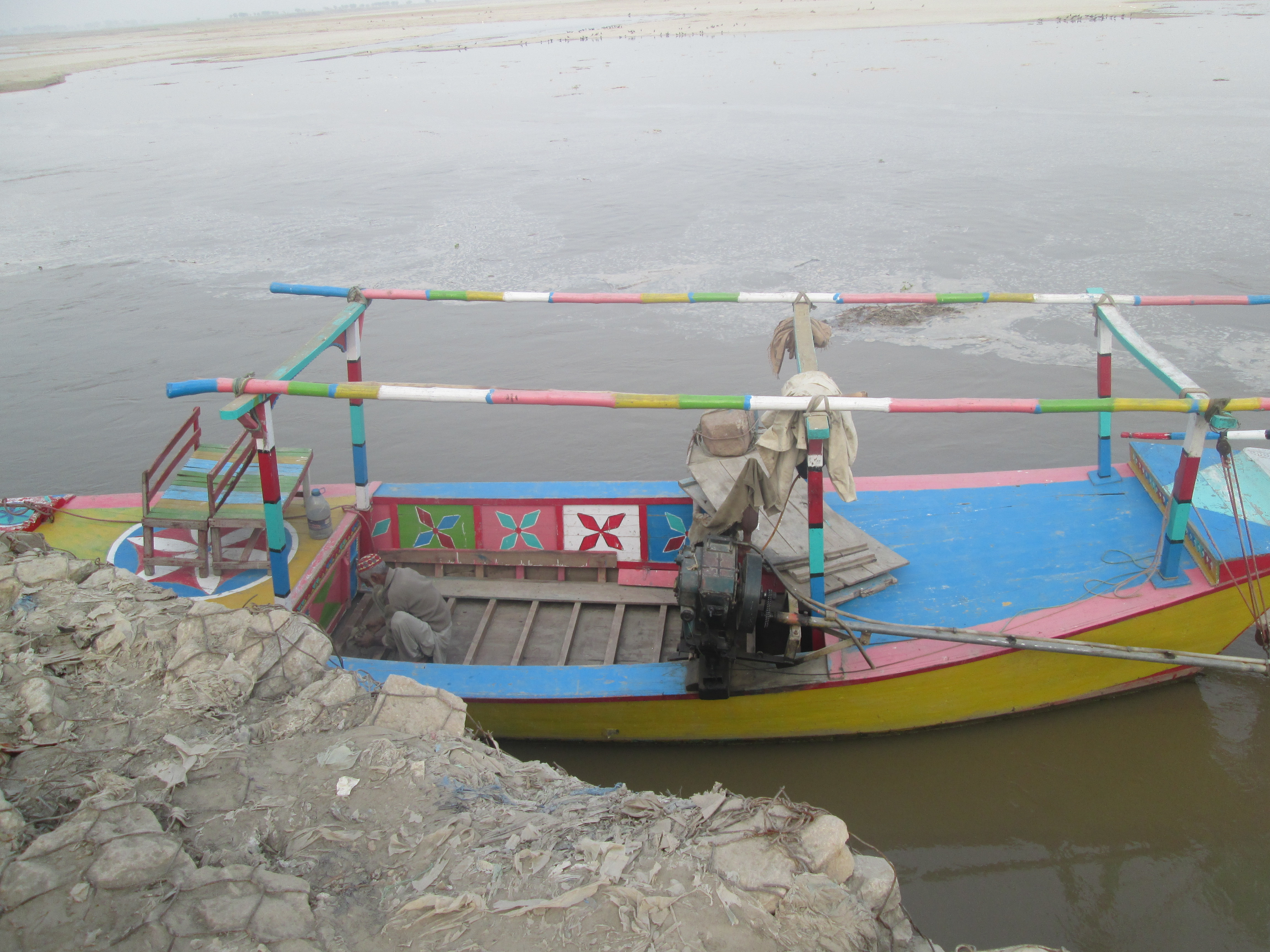
Indus near Dera Ismail Khan

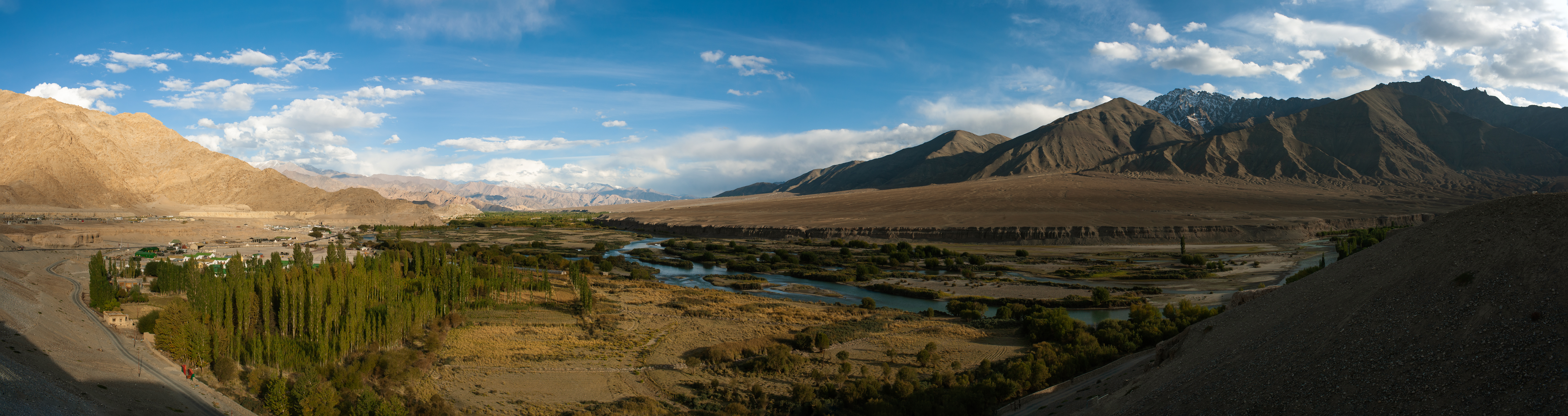
The Indus near Leh

== Tourism ==
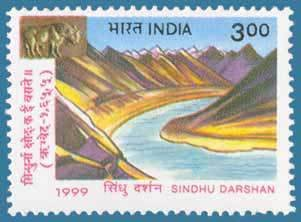
₹3.00 postage stamp issued by India Post in 1999.

Many Buddhist monasteries in Ladakh, Indus Valley Civilisation sites along the banks of Indus and Sarasvati River (Ghaggar-Hakra River) and in Indus Sagar Doab, Indus River Delta, various dams such as Baglihar Dam, Sindhu Darshan Festival held every year at Leh, Sindhu Pushkaram festival held every 12 years at confluence of Indus and Zanskar rivers at Nimoo once every 12 years for 12 days starting from when Jupiter enter into Kumbha rasi (Aquarius), etc. are tourism opportunities.

Sindhu Darshan Festival, 3 days annual festival in June, is held at Sindhu Ghat at Shey off NH3 9 km southeast of Leh city as a celebration of the Sindhu River (Indus), as the river is an important historical icon in India and has been worshiped since the times of Ancient India. The Bollywood film Dil Se was shot during the first Sindhu Darshan Festival in October 1997.

== See also ==
- Geology of the Himalayas
- HMS Indus
- List of most-polluted rivers
- List of rivers of Pakistan
- Rigvedic rivers
- Rivers of Jammu and Kashmir
- Sindhology
- Ganges

== General and cited references ==
- Albinia, Alice. (2008) Empires of the Indus: The Story of a River. First American Edition (20101) W. W. Norton & Company, New York. ISBN 978-0-393-33860-7.
- Alexander Burnes, A voyage on the Indus, London, 1973
- Philippe Fabry, Wandering with the Indus, with Yusuf Shahid (text) Lahore, 1995
- Jean Fairley, The Lion River: The Indus, London, 1975
- Frisch, Wolfgang; Meschede, Martin; Blakey, Ronald (2011). Plate Tectonics: Continental Drift and Mountain Building. Heidelberg: Springer. doi:10.1007/978-3-540-76504-2. ISBN 978-3-540-76503-5.
- G.P. Malalasekera (1 September 2003). Dictionary of Pali Proper Names. Vol. 1. Asian Educational Services. ISBN 978-81-2061-823-7.
- D. Murphy, Where the Indus is Young, London, 1977
- Parpola, Asko (15 July 2015). The Roots of Hinduism: The Early Aryans and the Indus Civilization. Oxford University Press. ISBN 978-0-19-022693-0.
- Samina Quraeshi, Legacy of the Indus, New York, 1974
- Schomberg, Between Oxus and Indus, London, 1935
- Francine Tissot, Les Arts anciens du Pakistan et de l'Afghanistan, Paris, 1987
- Sir M. Wheeler, Civilisations of the Indus Valley and Beyond, London, 1966
- World Atlas, Millennium Edition, p. 265.
