= Silon =

Silon may refer to:

- A man-in-the-browser threat on Windows
- A polyamide polymer fibre developed by Otto Wichterle and others in the 1940s

== See also ==
- Silonia
- Silone, a surname
