= White catfish =

White catfish may refer to:

- Silonia childreni, native to South Asia
- Ameiurus catus, native to North America
