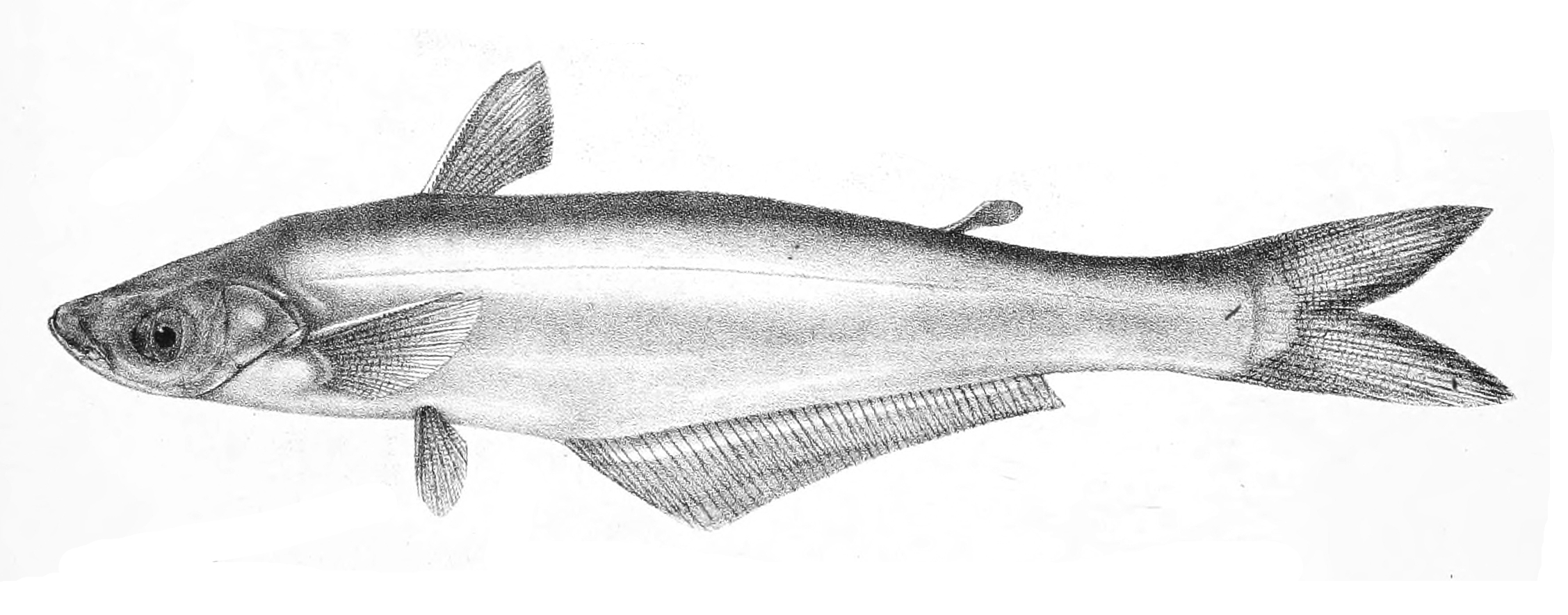

Conservation status
- Least Concern (IUCN 3.1)

Scientific classification
- Kingdom: Animalia
- Phylum: Chordata
- Class: Actinopterygii
- Division: Teleostei
- Order: Siluriformes
- Family: Ailiidae
- Genus: Silonia
- Species: S. silondia

Binomial name
- Silonia silondia (Hamilton, 1822)

Synonyms
- Pimelodus silondia Hamilton, 1822; Ageniosus lurida Swainson, 1838; Silonia lurida (Swainson, 1838); Silundia gangetica Valenciennes, 1840

= Silonia silondia =

Species of fish

Silonia silondia, the Silond catfish, is a species of schilbid catfish native to Pakistan, India, Bangladesh and Nepal This species grows to a length of 183 centimetres (72 in) TL. These fish inhabit rivers and occur in shoals. Adults ascend from estuaries into large rivers for breeding during monsoons. After the water level recedes, they often get stranded in small pools.

== Culture ==
In Myanmar, this catchfish is known as Nga-myins. Fishers use moths from local lakes for bait. To catch these shallow-water fish, the hooks are attached to bamboo poles in shallow water.
