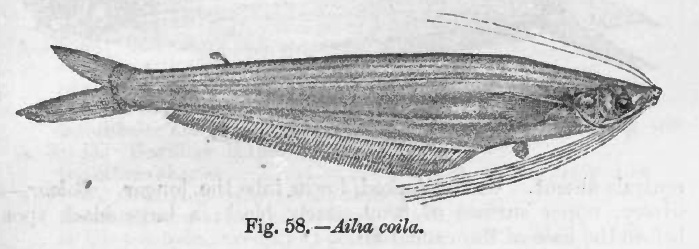

Conservation status
- Near Threatened (IUCN 3.1)

Scientific classification
- Kingdom: Animalia
- Phylum: Chordata
- Class: Actinopterygii
- Division: Teleostei
- Order: Siluriformes
- Family: Ailiidae
- Genus: Ailia; Gray, 1930
- Species: A. coila

Binomial name
- Ailia coila (F. Hamilton, 1822)

Synonyms
- Malapterurus coila F. Hamilton, 1822; Malapterus (Ailia) bengalensis Gray, 1830; Silurus (Acanthonotus) cuvieri Gray, 1830; Acanthonotus hardwickii Gray, 1831; Ailia affinis Günther, 1864

= Ailia =

Monospecific genus of fish

Ailia is a monospecific genus of freshwater ray-finned fish belonging to the family Ailiidae, the Asian schilbeids or Asian butter catfishes. The only species in this genus is Ailia coila, the Gangetic ailia, a catfish is found in southern Asia.

== Taxonomy ==
Ailia coila was first formally described as Malapterurus coila in 1822 by the Scottish surgeon, surveyor and botanist Francis Buchanan-Hamilton with its type locality given as Bengal. In 1830 John Edward Gray described a new species and placed it in a subgenus of Malapterus, Malapterus (Ailia) bengalensis which is now regarded as a synonym of Buchanan-Hamilton's Malapterurus coila, in the monospecific genus Ailia. Ailia is the type genus of the family Ailiidae, the Asian schilbeids. A. coila is most closely related to Eutropiichthys vacha with 85.63% genetic sequence identity.

== Etymology ==
Ailia is the local name for this taxon and the related Ailiichthys punctata in India. The specific name, coila, was not explained by Buchanan-Hamilton but it is possibly a Latinisation of the Assamese kajoli, a name for this species in the Rangpur, Bangladesh.

== Description ==
Ailia has an elongated body which reaches a total length of 30 cm (12 in), although 18 cm (7.1 in) is more typical.

== Distribution and habitat ==
Ailia is found in Bangladesh, northern India, Nepal and Pakistan. This species is found in large rivers with turbid water running over sandy or muddy beds.

== Utilisation ==
Ailia is of importance to local commercial fisheries.

== Conservation status ==
Ailia' has a sharply decreasing habitat due to natural and anthropogenic causes. The International Union for Conservation of Nature have assessed Alia coila as Near Threatened because this species has substantially declined due to overfishing.
