= Sindhu Darshan Festival =

Festival in Ladakh, India

Sindhu Darshan Festival is a festival held in Leh, Ladakh, India. The festival is held every year in June on the full moon day of Guru Purnima. On this day, devotees gather near the banks of the Indus River, which is known as the Sindhu River in India. Since 1997, the festival has stretched for three days, attracting large numbers of foreign and domestic tourists.

The Sindhu Darshan Festival is held as a celebration of the River Sindhu, as the river is an important historical icon in India and has been worshiped since the times of Ancient India.

== History ==
=== 1996: Origin of the festival ===
Lal Krishna Advani and Tarun Vijay, veteran journalists, re-discovered the Sindhu river flowing through Ladakh, when they visited Leh in January 1996. Vijay conceived the idea of a festival on its banks as the river is the source of identity for India as the names India, Indian, Hindu and Hindustan are derived from Indus and Sindhu. Since then, the festival has been attracting people from all walks of life, castes, religions and places, especially becoming a pilgrimage for Sindhi Hindus, who in pre-partition days, used to worship the river in their homeland of Sindh, now in Pakistan. Lal Krishna Advani, in 1996, himself a Sindhi, visited Choglamsar (8 km from Leh) and started the Sindhu Darshan Abhiyan, with handful of other Sindhis.

=== 1997: Annualised event ===
In October 1997, this event was annualised and has been held with the formal name Sindhu Darshan Festival.

=== 1999: Postage stamp ===
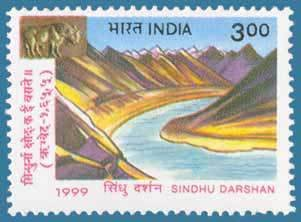
₹3.00 postage stamp issued by India Post in 1999.

The Postal Department of Government of India issued a postage stamp depicting Sindhu Darshan Festival on 28 July 1999. The project 'Sindhu Darshan', was started to focus attention on the heritage of the ancient Indian Civilization and Culture that 'Sindhu' symbolizes. It aims to celebrate the Sindhu as a symbol of this country's ethnic diversity and to promote communal harmony. Further, attention is sought to be focused on cultural and topographical beauty of the landscape of Ladakh. These aspects are sought to be blended in the design of the First Day Cover which also carries inscription of the hymn 'mantra', chanted by Buddhists in the area, a prayer in praise of God. The stamp depicts a landscape in the upper reaches of the Sindhu with an inset of the 'Vrishabha' (bull) seal of the Indus Valley Civilization and a line, from the 'Rig Veda', describing the Sindhu River.

=== 2000: Sindhu Darshan Festival ===
On 7 June 2000, Sindhu Darshan Festival was held with much pomp and show and was inaugurated by Atal Bihari Vajpayee, then the Prime Minister of India at Shey (15 km away from Leh).The Prime Minister laid the foundation stone of the Sindhu Cultural Center and also inaugurated the new office complex of Ladakh Autonomous Hill Development Council.

The Prime Minister, Atal Bihari Vajpayee, said "Some people queried about existence of Sindhu in India as described in our national anthem but little did they know that it flows from our soil in Ladakh." He further added : "Sindhu symbolised 5,000 years ethos of Indian civilization and its re-discovery will strengthen emotional integration of country." and quoted hymn from Rig Veda: "Sindhu it might surpasses all the streams that flow - His roar is lifted up to heaven above the earth, he puts forth endless vigour with a flash of light, even as cow with milk rush to their calves, so other rivers roar in to Sindhu. As warrior king leads other warriors, so does Sindhu lead other rivers. Rich in good steed is Sindhu, rich in gold, nobly fashioned rich in ample wealth."

The occasion, was also marked by immersion of waters from Brahmaputra brought by Arunachal Pradesh Chief Minister, Mukut Mithi. Brahmaputra & Sindhu, both rivers rise from same source in Mansarovar.

=== 2026: Sindhu Kumbh Mela ===
The 30th annual Sindhu Darshan Yatra (Sindhu Darshan Yatra ), from 22nd to 27th June 2026, will be celebrated as the first Sindhu Kumbh Mela.

== Festivities ==
Every year, a large number of participants from different parts of the country participate in Sindhu Darshan Festival. They bring water from the river of their own state in earthenware pots and immerse these pots in the Sindhu River.

The first day of the Sindhu Darshan Festival witnesses a reception ceremony for the participants, organized on the banks of Sindhu at Shey. This reception ceremony is conducted by a joint association of committees of various religious groups ( Buddhist, Shia, Sunni, Christian, Hindu and Sikh ) namely, Ladakh Buddhist Association, Shia Majlis, Sunni Anjuman, Christian Moravian Church, Hindu Trust and Sikh Gurudwara Prabhandak Committee, to promote national integrity. As a part of the ritual, fifty senior Lamas conduct a prayer on the banks of the river. A series of cultural programs is also presented by the artists from various states of the country. A sightseeing tour is organised for the participants and the day comes to an end with a bonfire at night.

On the second day, after the cultural programmes and sightseeing trip, a Puja is organized.

On the third day, the participants get ready for the departure. Leh is popular with tourists, who visit the hill town to be a part of this grand celebrations.

== In popular culture ==
The Bollywood film Dil Se was shot during the first Sindhu Darshan Festival in October 1997.

== See also ==
- Festivals in Ladakh
  - Galdan Namchot festival commemorates the Je Tsongkhapa a guru of Gelug school of Tibetan Buddhism
  - Ladakh International Film Festival (LIFF)
  - Losar buddhist festival
  - Sindhu Pushkaram festival, every 12 years at confluence of Indus & Zanskar River
- Music of Ladakh
- Tourism in Ladakh
