= Indus Gorge =

Gorge formed by the Indus River in the Himalayas

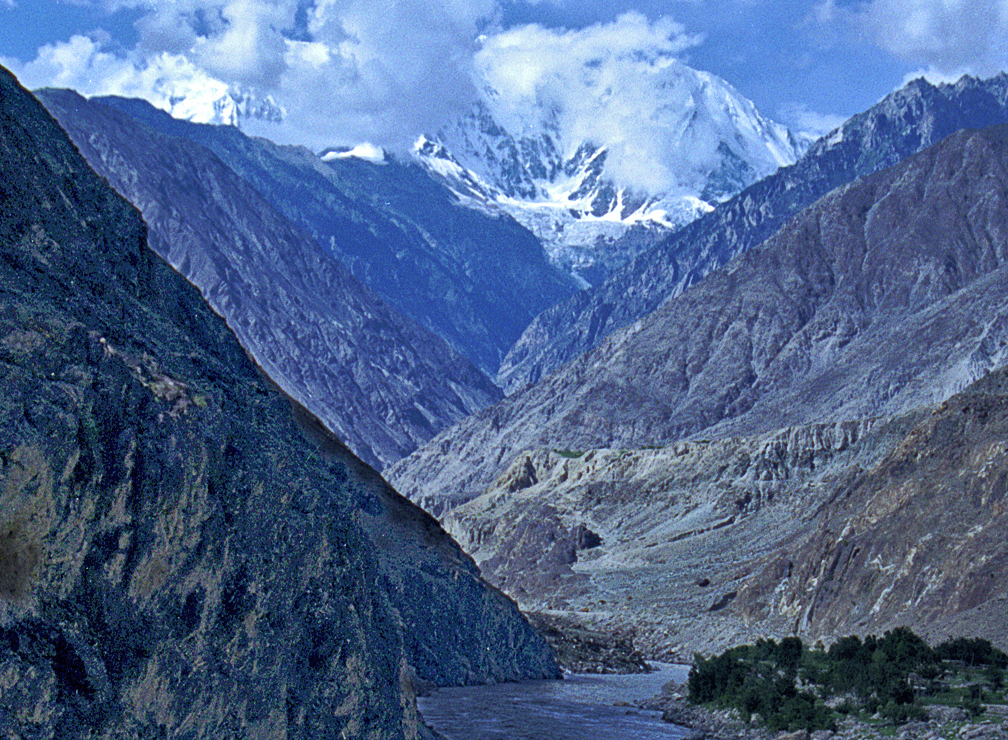
The Indus Gorge with Nanga Parbat, the world's ninth-highest mountain, rising to the south

The Indus Gorge is a gorge formed by the Indus River as it skirts the Nanga Parbat massif, the western anchor of the Greater Himalayas, before it debouches into the plains of Punjab in Pakistan. The gorge is 4,500–5,200 m (14,800–17,100 ft) deep near the Nanga Parbat. The massive amounts of erosion due to the Indus River following the capture and rerouting through that area is thought to bring middle and lower crustal rocks to the surface. Gilgit is the westernmost tributary of the Indus River.

== See also ==
- Geology of the Himalayas
- Rigvedic rivers
