= Laides =

Scientific classification
- Kingdom: Animalia
- Phylum: Chordata
- Class: Actinopterygii
- Order: Siluriformes
- Family: Ailiidae
- Genus: Laides; D. S. Jordan, 1919

Type species
- Pangasius hexanema Bleeker, 1852

Synonyms
- Laïs Bleeker, 1857

Genus of fishes

Laides is a genus of catfish in the family Ailiidae native to Asia. These species originate from Mekong and Chao Phraya River basins.

== Species ==
There are currently four recognized species in this genus:

- Laides hexanema (Bleeker, 1852)
- Laides longibarbis (Fowler, 1934)
- Laides montanus (Hora, 1937)
- Laides sinensis (S. Y. Huang, 1981)
