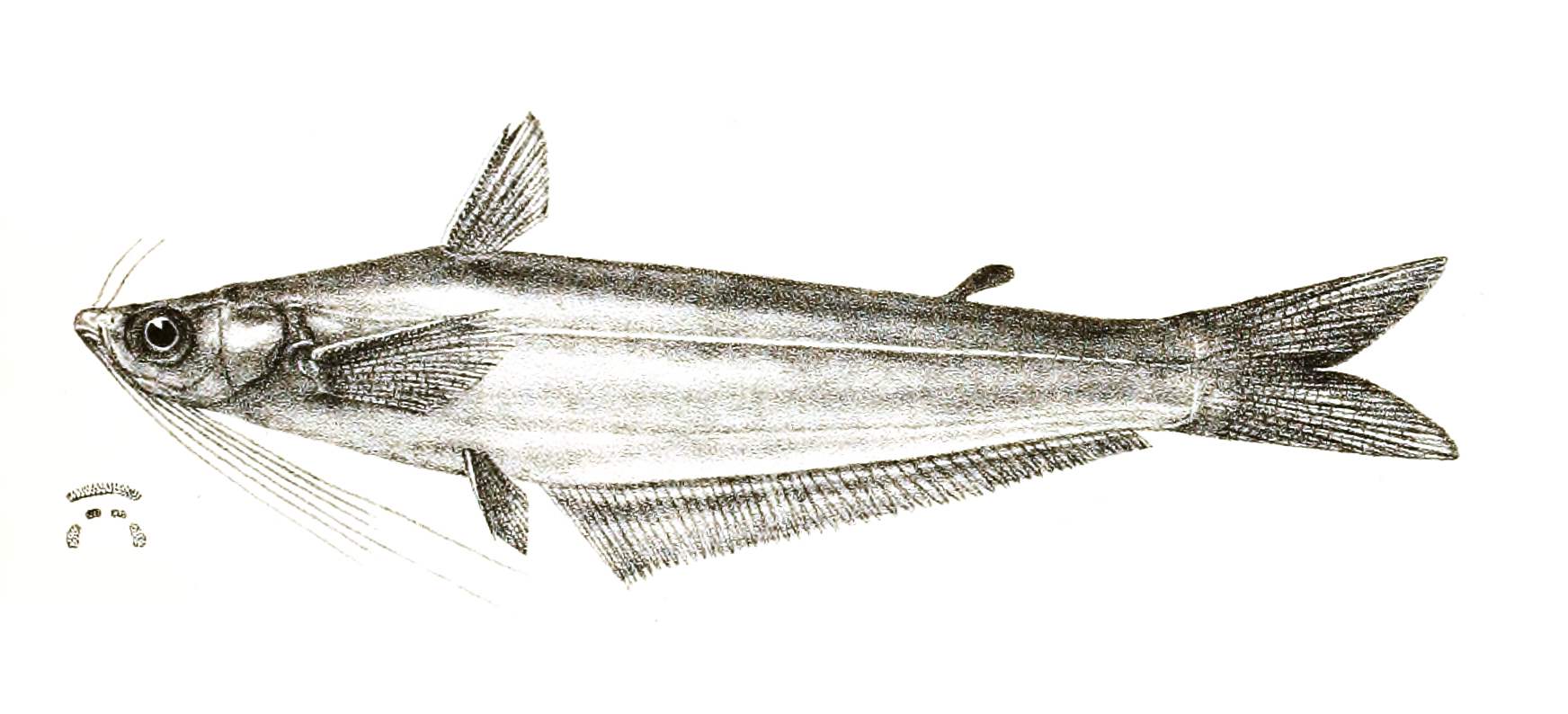
- Pseudotropius taakree

Scientific classification
- Kingdom: Animalia
- Phylum: Chordata
- Class: Actinopterygii
- Division: Teleostei
- Order: Siluriformes
- Family: Ailiidae
- Genus: Proeutropiichthys; Hora, 1937

Type species
- Eutropius macropthalmos (Blyth, 1860)

= Proeutropiichthys =

Genus of fishes

Proeutropiichthys is a genus of schilbid catfishes native to Asia.

== Species ==
There are currently three recognized species in this genus:

- Proeutropiichthys buchanani (Valenciennes, 1840)
- Proeutropiichthys macropthalmos (Blyth, 1860)
- Proeutropiichthys taakree (Sykes, 1839)
