= Sir Aga Khan Bridge =

Bridge on the Indus River in Pakistan

- Carries: Single lane of motor traffic, pedestrian/cycleway one side

Characteristics
- Design: Beam
- Total length: 1,750 m (5,740 ft; 1.09 mi)

History
- Construction cost: $67.33 million
- Opened: 01 February 2017
- Inaugurated: 27 February 2017

The Sir Aga Khan Jhirk Mulla Katiyar Bridge is a 1,750-metre (5,740 ft) single-span beam bridge in Pakistan, that connects Tando Muhammad Khan with Thatta. It is the longest bridge on the Indus River. It is named after Sir Aga Khan.

== History ==
The bridge was officially opened to traffic on 27 February 2017. It was inaugurated by Pakistan People's Party (PPP) chairperson Bilawal Bhutto Zardari.
