= Kotri Barrage =

Indus River barrage in Sindh, Pakistan

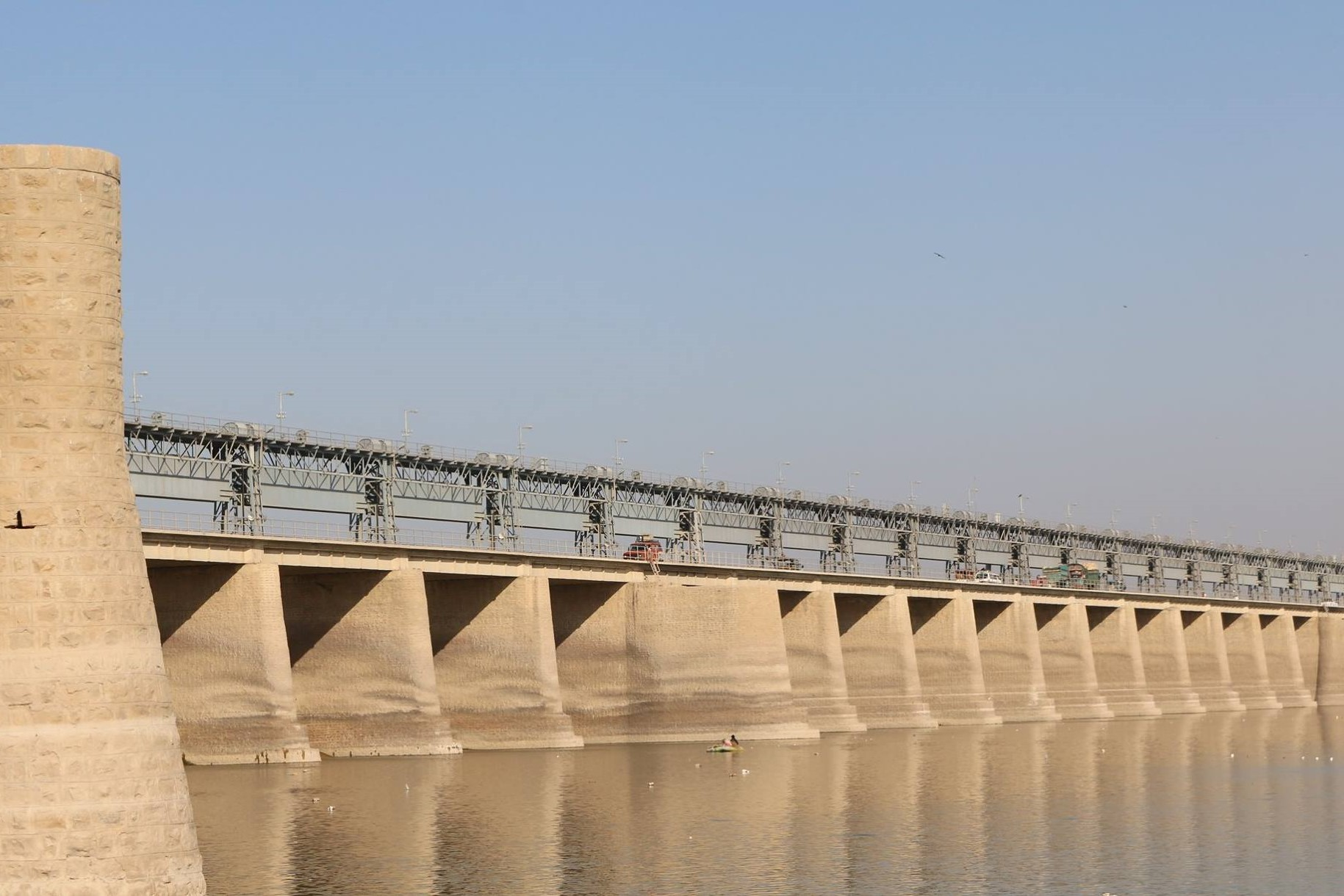
- Interactive map of Kotri Barrage
- Official name: کوٹری بیراج
- Country: Pakistan
- Location: Sindh
- Coordinates: 25°26′32″N 68°19′0″E
- Opening date: 1955
- Operators: Sindh Irrigation & Power Department

Dam and spillways
- Impounds: Indus River
- Length: 1,600 m (5,200 ft)

Kotri Barrage, also known as the Ghulam Muhammad Barrage, is a barrage on the Indus River between Jamshoro and Hyderabad in the Sindh province of Pakistan. The barrage was completed in 1955 and inaugurated by Ghulam Muhammad, then governor-general of Pakistan. It is used to control water flow in the Indus for irrigation and flood control purposes.

It has a discharge capacity of 24,800 cubic metres per second (875,000 cu ft/s). It is a gate-controlled weir type barrage with a navigation lock. The barrage has 44 bays, each 18 metres (60 ft) wide. The maximum flood level height of Kotri Barrage is 13.1 metres (43.1 ft). It feeds Fulleli, Pinyari, and Kalri Baghar canals.

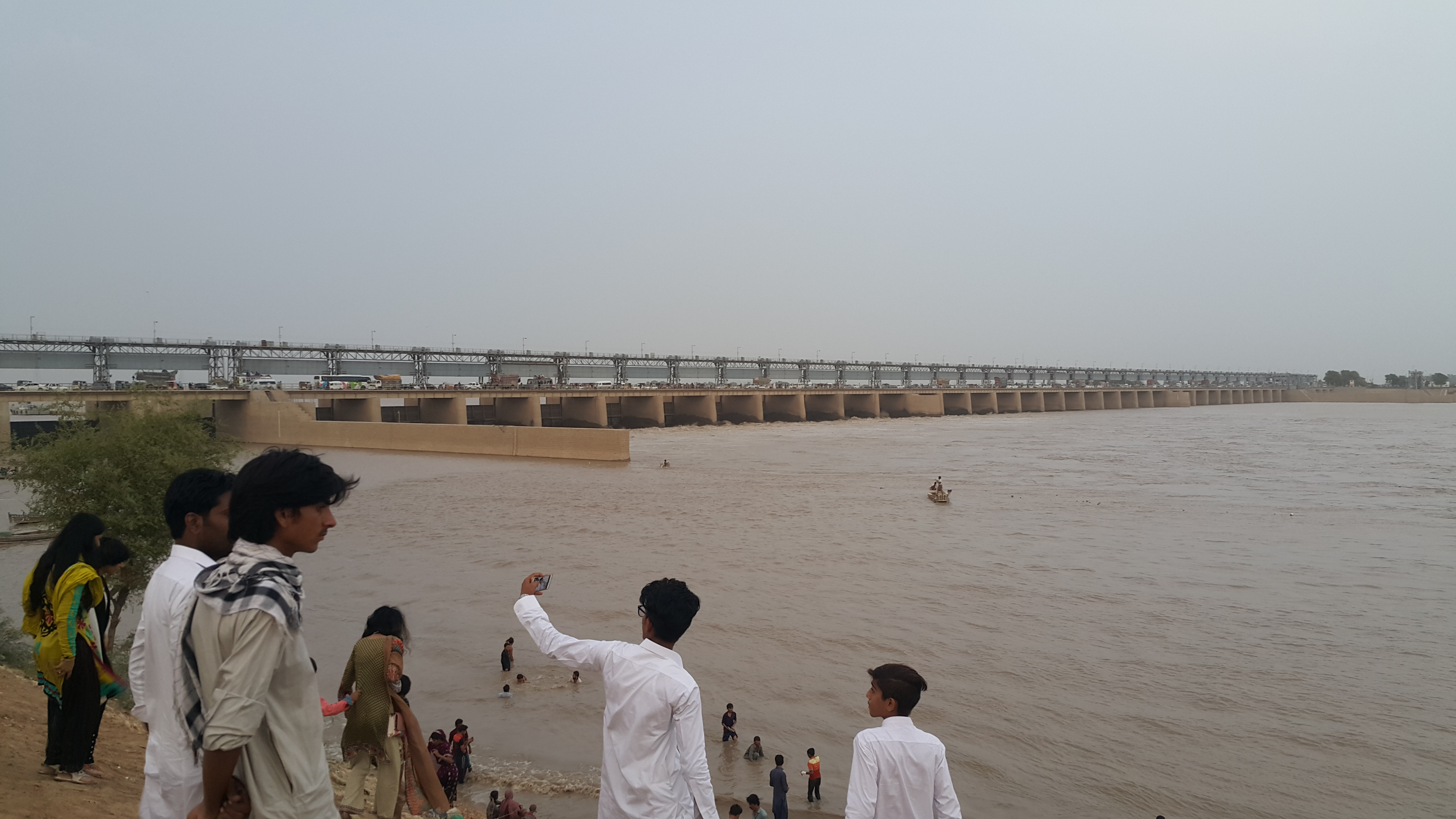

== See also ==
- List of barrages and headworks in Pakistan
- List of dams and reservoirs in Pakistan
