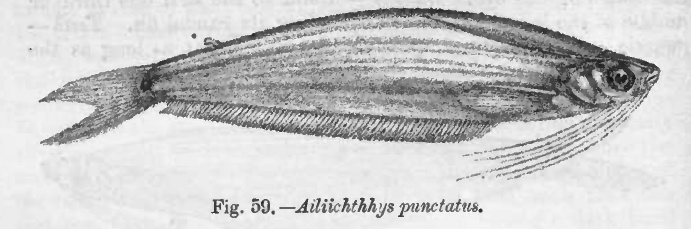

Conservation status
- Least Concern (IUCN 3.1)

Scientific classification
- Missing taxonomy template (fix): Ailiichthys
- Species: Template:Taxonomy/AiliichthysA. punctata

Binomial name
- Template:Taxonomy/AiliichthysAiliichthys punctata Day, 1872

Synonyms
- Ailia punctata (Day, 1872)

= Ailiichthys =

Species of fish

Ailiichthys is a monospecific genus of freshwater ray-finned fish belonging to the family Ailiidae, the Asian schilbeids. The only species in the genus is Ailiichthys punctata, also known as the Jamuna ailia, which occcurs in Bangladesh, India and Pakistan. The species is heavily fished and other threats include habitat loss, pollution and introduced species but the exact effects are unknown. This species grows to a length of 10.0 centimetres (3.9 in) TL.
