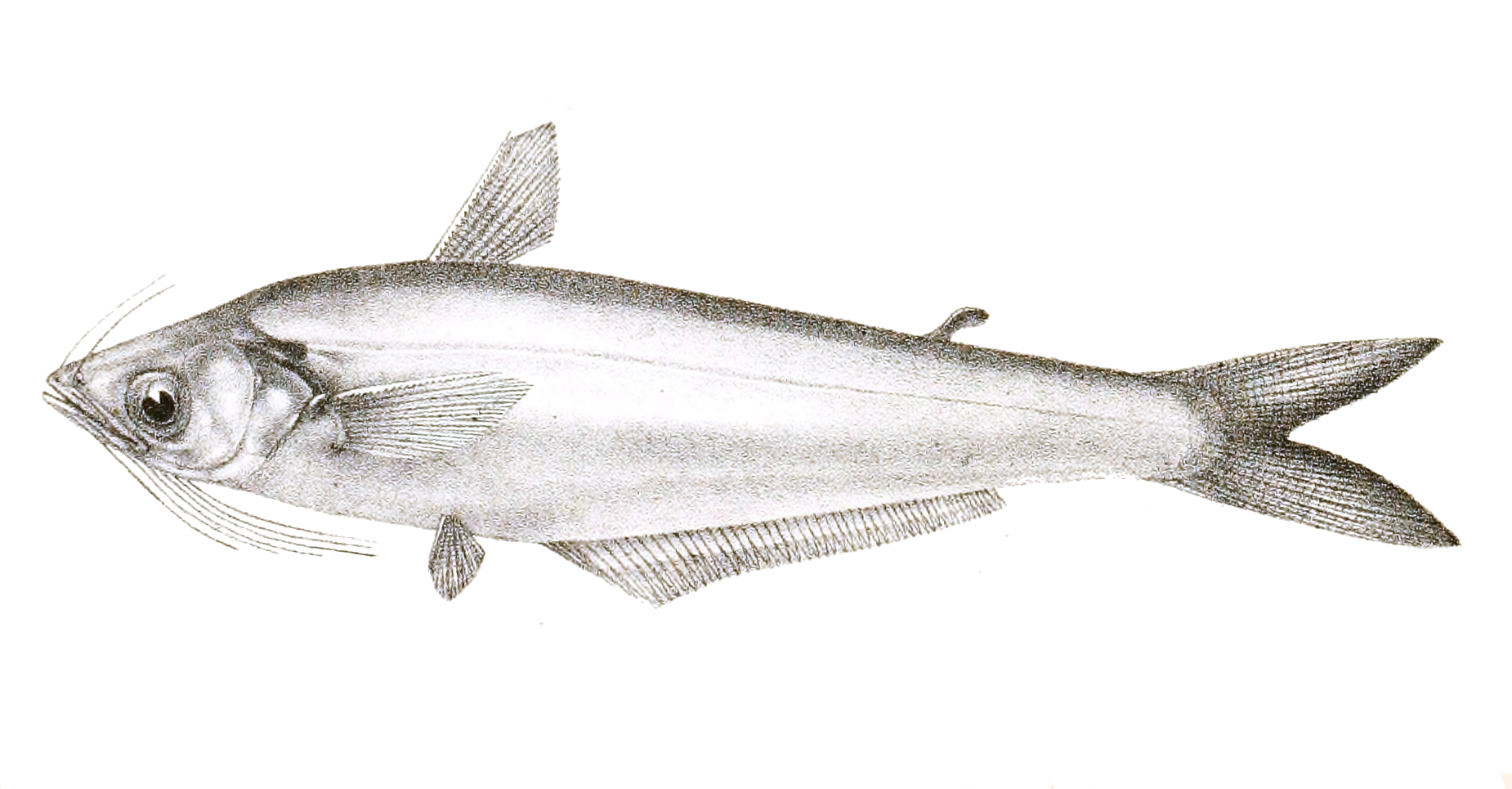
- Eutropiichthys vacha

Scientific classification
- Domain: Eukaryota
- Kingdom: Animalia
- Phylum: Chordata
- Class: Actinopterygii
- Order: Siluriformes
- Family: Schilbeidae
- Genus: Eutropiichthys
- Species: E. vacha

Binomial name
- Eutropiichthys vacha Hamilton, 1822

Synonyms
- Bagrus vacha Hamilton, 1822; Eutropiichthys burmannicus Day, 1877; Eutropiichthys vacha burmannicus Day, 1877; Pachypterus punctatus Swainson, 1839; Pimelodus vacha Hamilton, 1822

= Eutropiichthys vacha =

Species of fish

Eutropiichthys vacha is a species of schilbid catfish native to India, Nepal, Bhutan, and Bangladesh. It can reach a length of 34 cm, and a mass of 1.35 kg. Eutropiichthys vacha is a climate sensitive species that may be selected as a target species for climate change impact studies. Region-specific adaptation was noticed in breeding phenology of this schilbid catfish in River Ganga, based on local trends of warming climate. A threshold water temperature around 24 °C and rainfall of > 100 mm were found to be necessary for attainment of breeding GSI (> 3.5 units) in E. vacha. It appears that warming climate may have the most profound effect on gonad maturation and spawning in E. vacha.
