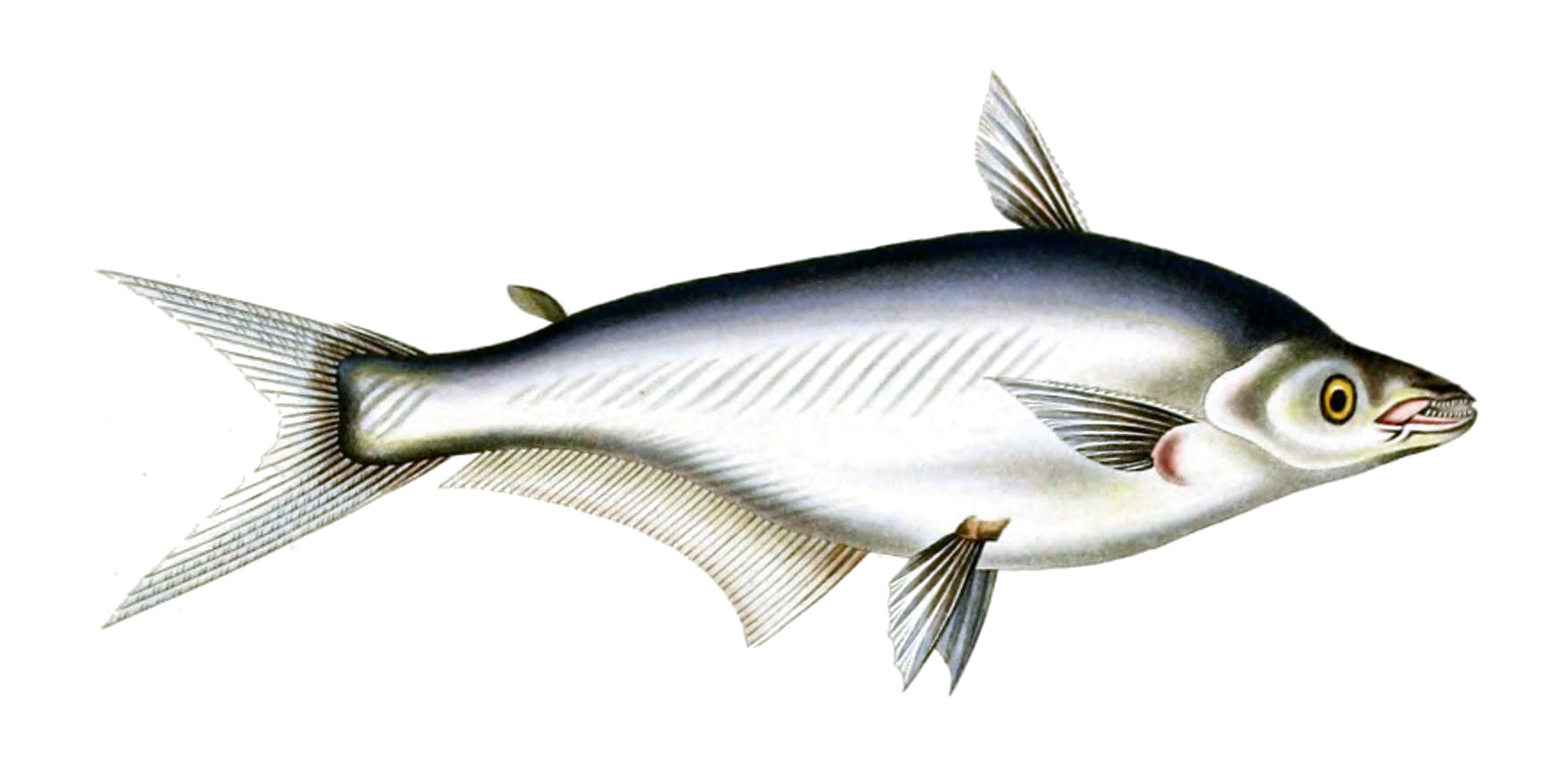
- Silonia childreni

Scientific classification
- Kingdom: Animalia
- Phylum: Chordata
- Class: Actinopterygii
- Order: Siluriformes
- Family: Ailiidae
- Genus: Silonia; Swainson, 1838

Type species
- Ageniosus (Silonia) lurida Swainson, 1838

Synonyms
- Silundia Valenciennes, 1840; Silondia Günther, 1864; Silonopangasius Hora, 1937

= Silonia =

Genus of fishes

Silonia is a genus of schilbid catfishes native to Asia.

== Species ==
There are currently two recognized species in this genus:

- Silonia childreni (Sykes, 1839)
- Silonia silondia (Hamilton, 1822) (Silond catfish)
