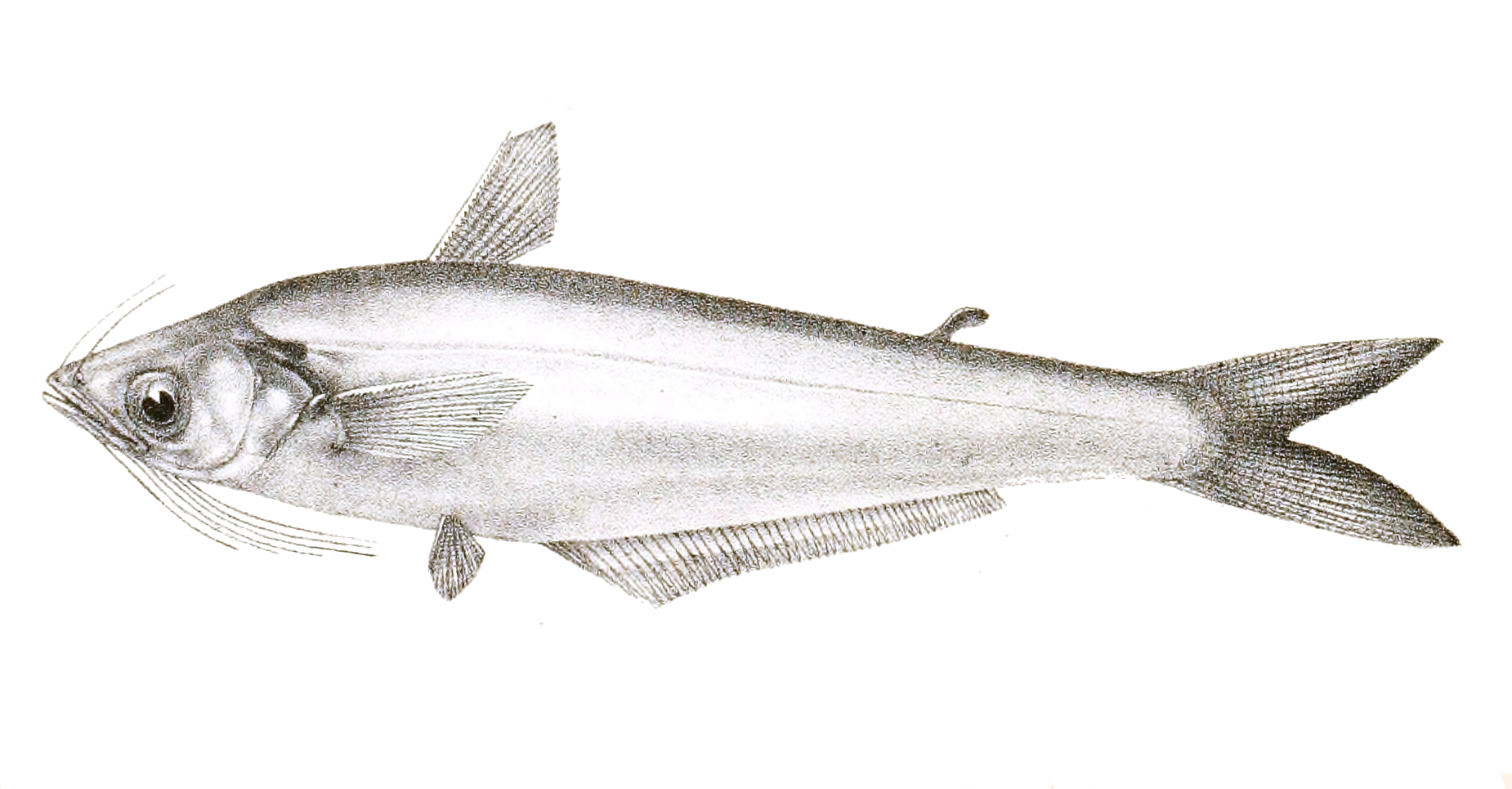
- Eutropiichthys vacha

Scientific classification
- Kingdom: Animalia
- Phylum: Chordata
- Class: Actinopterygii
- Order: Siluriformes
- Family: Ailiidae
- Genus: Eutropiichthys; Bleeker, 1862

Type species
- Pimelodus vacha Hamilton, 1822

Species
- See text

= Eutropiichthys =

Genus of fishes

Eutropiichthys is a genus of schilbid catfishes native to Asia.

== Species ==
There are currently 7 recognized species in this genus:

- Eutropiichthys britzi Ferraris & Vari, 2007
- Eutropiichthys burmannicus Day, 1877
- Eutropiichthys cetosus H. H. Ng, Lalramliana, Lalronunga & Lalnuntluanga, 2014
- Eutropiichthys goongwaree Sykes, 1839
- Eutropiichthys murius Hamilton, 1822
- Eutropiichthys salweenensis Ferraris & Vari, 2007
- Eutropiichthys vacha Hamilton, 1822
