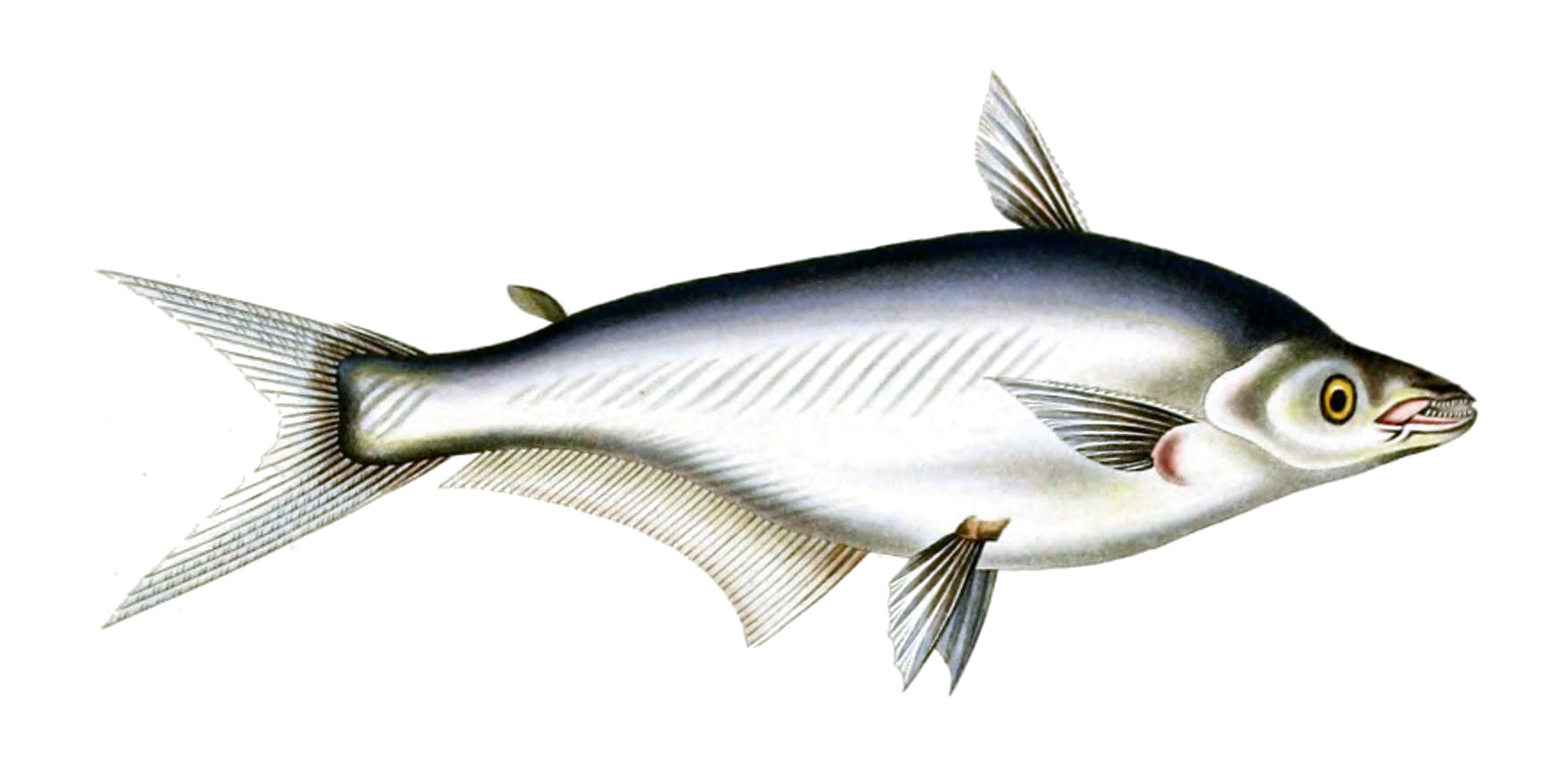

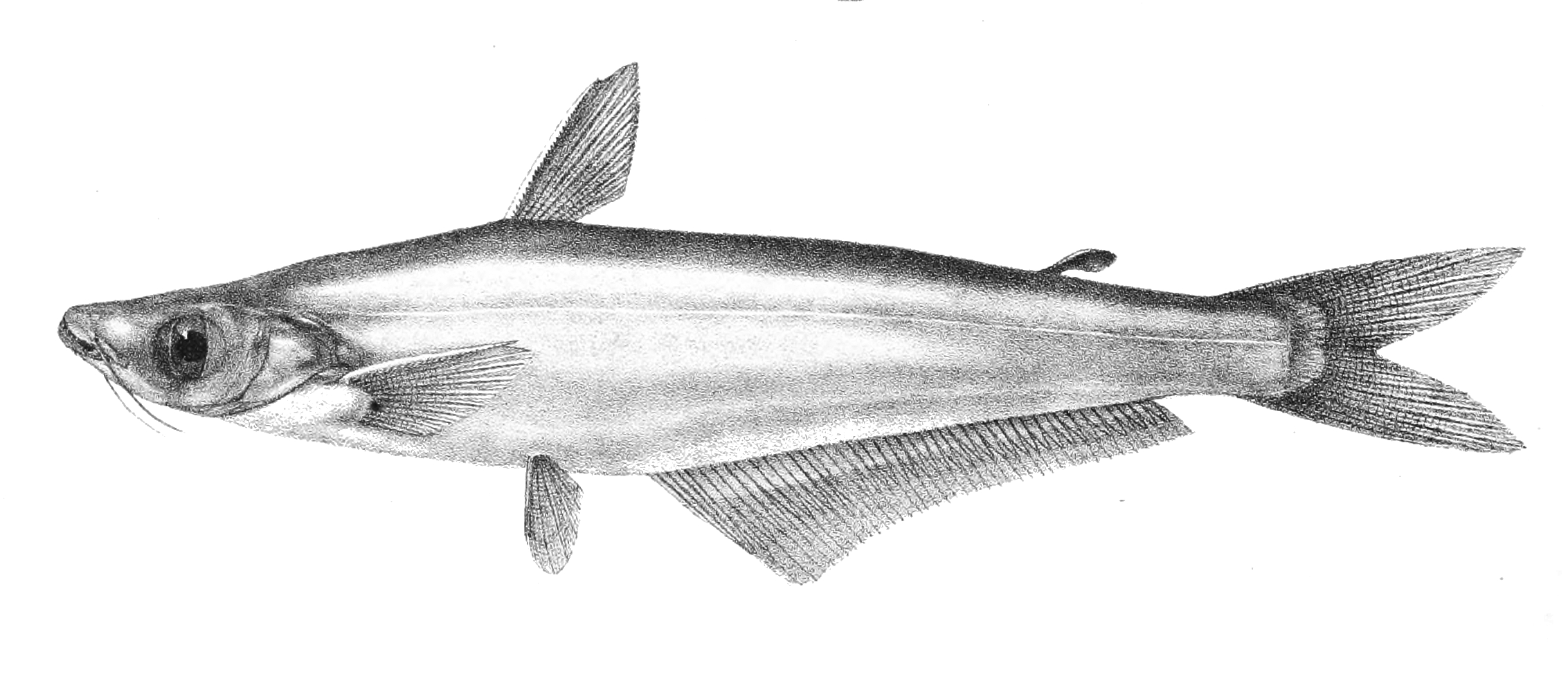

Conservation status
- Endangered (IUCN 3.1)

Scientific classification
- Kingdom: Animalia
- Phylum: Chordata
- Class: Actinopterygii
- Order: Siluriformes
- Family: Schilbeidae
- Genus: Silonia
- Species: S. childreni

Binomial name
- Silonia childreni (Sykes, 1839)

Synonyms
- Ageneiosus childreni Sykes, 1839; Silonopangasius childreni (Sykes, 1839); Silundia sykesii Day, 1876

= Silonia childreni =

Species of fish

Silonia childreni, the white catfish, is a species of schilbid catfish endemic to India where it occurs in the Krishna, Godavari and Cauvery river systems of the Western Ghats. This species grows to a length of 48 centimetres (19 in) TL. These fish occur in large rivers and reservoirs. A gregarious fish, S. childreni moves in shoals during the monsoon. They feed on fish. S. childreni is a dominant species in the catches from deep waters, especially during the monsoon months between April and July.

It is locally extinct from the Mula-Mutha River and has experienced severe population decline rangewide due to overexploitation, drought and water management issues stemming from lack of dam releases. Habitat degradation may also be occurring due to water pollution.
