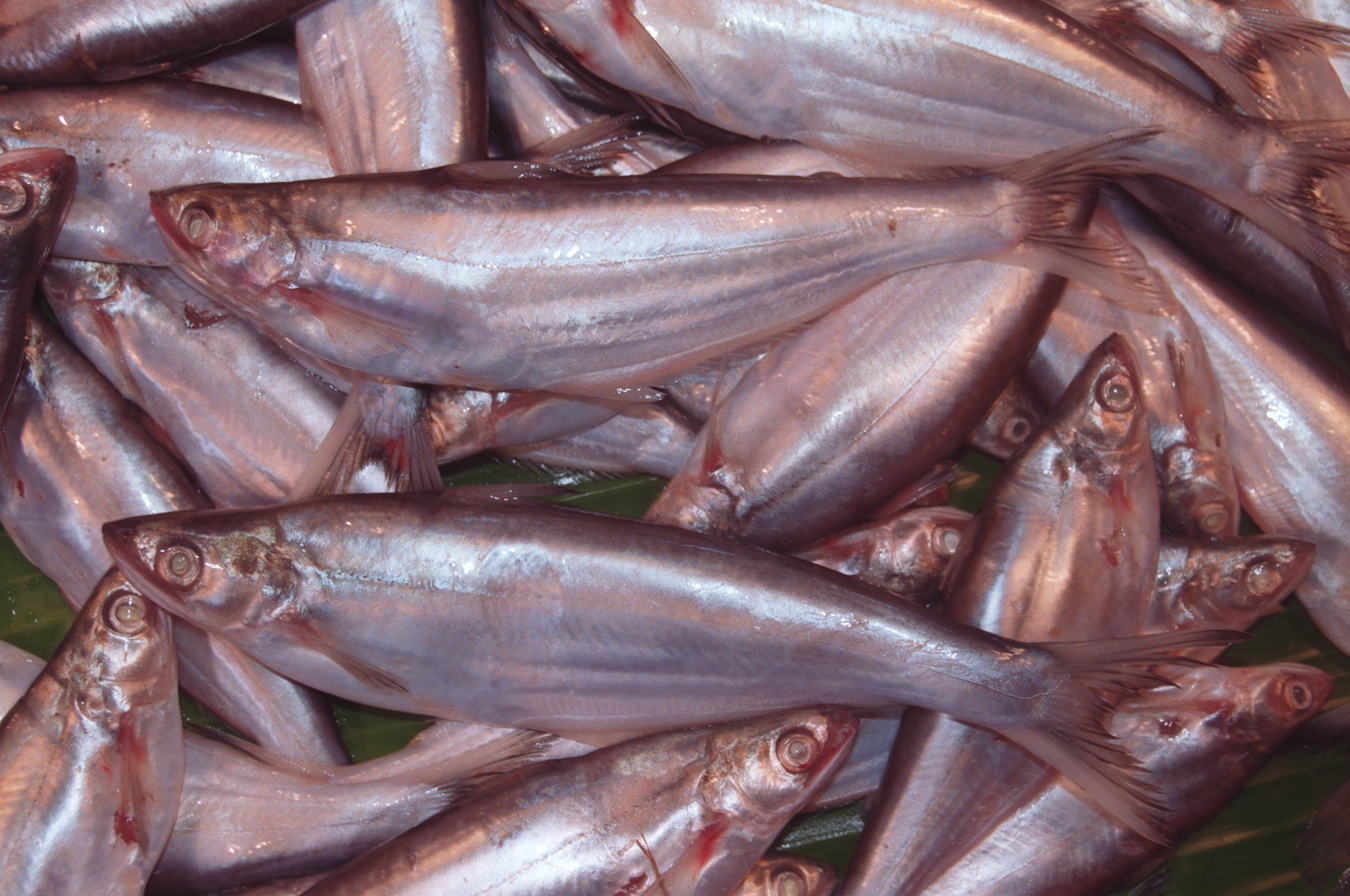
- Clupisoma garua

Scientific classification
- Kingdom: Animalia
- Phylum: Chordata
- Class: Actinopterygii
- Order: Siluriformes
- Family: Ailiidae
- Genus: Clupisoma; Swainson, 1838

= Clupisoma =

Genus of fishes

Clupisoma is a genus of catfish in the family Ailiidae native to Asia.

== Species ==
There are currently 7 recognized species in this genus:

- Clupisoma bastari A. K. Datta & A. K. Karmakar, 1980
- Clupisoma garua (F. Hamilton, 1822)
- Clupisoma longianale (S. Y. Huang, 1981)
- Clupisoma naziri Mirza & M. I. Awan, 1973
- Clupisoma prateri Hora, 1937
- Clupisoma roosae Ferraris, 2004
- Clupisoma yunnanense (He, Huang & Li, 1995)
