= Silone =

Silone is a surname of Italian origin. Notable people with this surname include:

- Ignazio Silone, Italian political leader and novelist nominated for the Nobel prize for literature ten times
- Josephine Silone Yates (1859-1912), the second president of the National Association of Colored Women and one of the first black professors hired at Lincoln University
