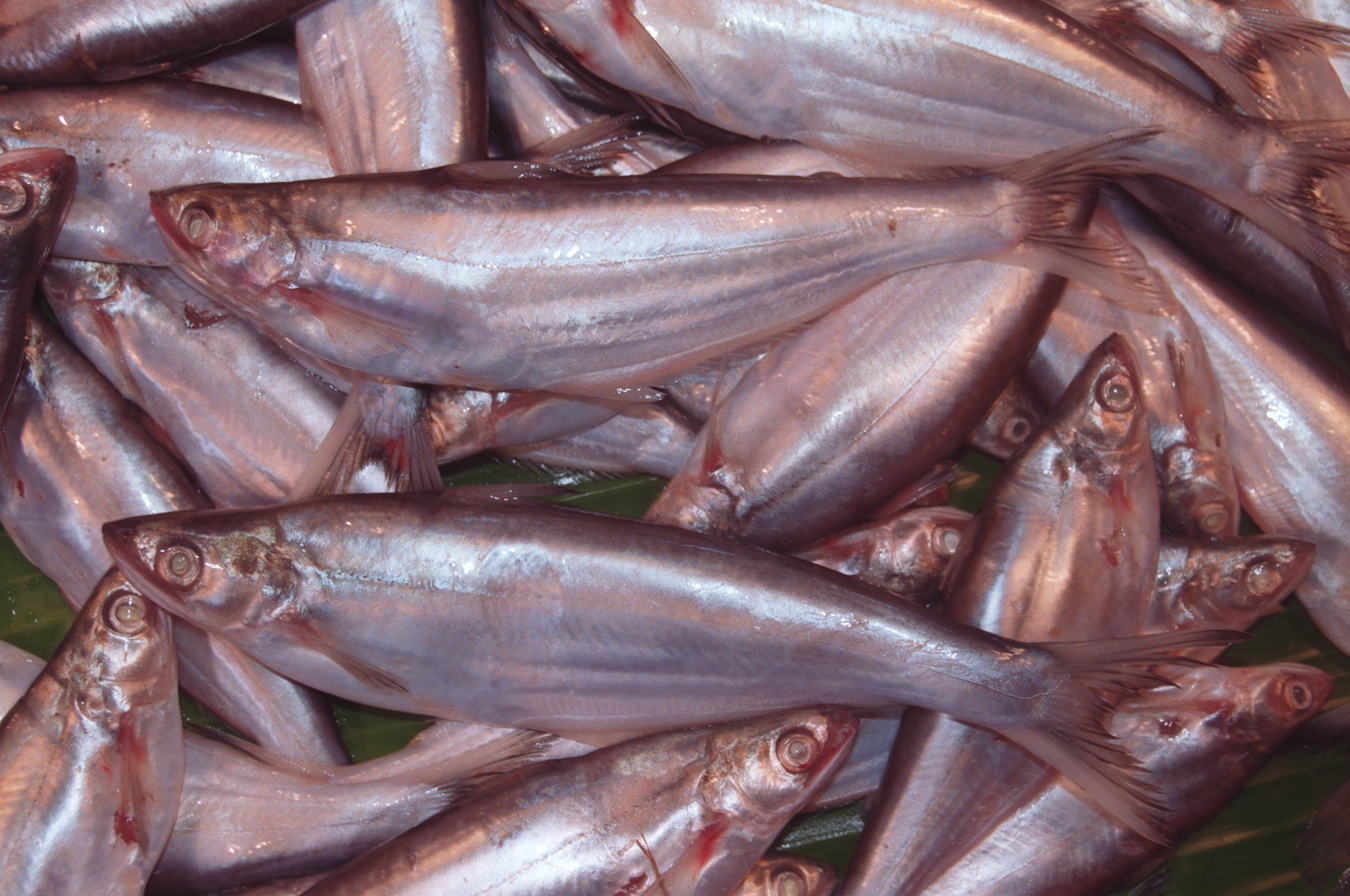
- Clupisoma garua

Scientific classification
- Kingdom: Animalia
- Phylum: Chordata
- Class: Actinopterygii
- Order: Siluriformes
- Family: Ailiidae; Bleeker, 1858

Genera
- Ailia Gray, 1830; Ailiichthys Day, 1872; Clupisoma Swainson, 1838; Eutropiichthys Bleeker 1862; Laides Jordan, 1919; Proeutropiichthys Hora, 1937; Silonia Swainson, 1838

= Ailiidae =

Family of fishes

Ailiidae is a family of catfishes native to Asia. These fishes usually have dorsal fins with a short base and a spine, but Ailia lack a dorsal fin altogether.
