= 1932 Birthday Honours =

British government recognitions

The King's Birthday Honours 1932 were appointments by King George V to various orders and honours to reward and highlight good works by members of the British Empire. The appointments were made to celebrate the official birthday of The King. They were published on 3 June 1932.

The recipients of honours are displayed here as they were styled before their new honour, and arranged by honour, with classes (Knight, Knight Grand Cross, etc.) and then divisions (Military, Civil, etc.) as appropriate.

== British Empire ==
=== Viscount ===
- The Right Honourable Stanley Owen, Baron Buckmaster, GCVO, Lord Chancellor, 1915–16. Chairman of the Governing Body of the Imperial College of Science and Technology.

=== Baron ===
- Lieutenant-Colonel Sir Arthur Charles Churchman, Bt, JP, DL, Member of Parliament for Woodbridge Division of Suffolk, 1920–29. For political and public services.
- David Davies, JP, Member of Parliament for Montgomeryshire, 1906–29. President of King Edward VII Welsh National Memorial Association. President of the Welsh Housing and Development Association. For public services.
- Henry Neville Gladstone, Lord Lieutenant of Flintshire. Treasurer, National Library of Wales. For political and public services.
- The Right Honourable James Fitzalan Hope, JP, Member of Parliament for the Brightside Division of Sheffield, 1900–06, and for Central Sheffield, 1908–29. Chairman of the Committee of Ways and Means and Deputy Speaker of the House of Commons, April 1921 to 1923, and December 1924 to June 1929. For political and public services.
- Major-General Sir Robert Hutchison, KCMG, CB, DSO, MP, Member of Parliament for Kirkcaldy, 1922–23, and for Montrose since 1924. Chief Liberal Whip, 1926–30. For political and public services.
- Sir Frederick William Lewis, Bt, JP, Chairman of the Development (Public Utility) Advisory Committee. Chairman of Furness Withy & Co. Ltd. For public services.

=== Privy Councillor ===
- Sir Horace Edmund (The Honourable Mr. Justice) Avory, LLD, A Judge of His Majesty's High Court of Justice since 1910, and the Senior Puisne Judge of the King's Bench Division since 1923.
- George Arthur Maurice, Baron Stanmore, KCVO, Deputy Speaker of the House of Lords, since 1916, and Chief Liberal Whip in the House of Lords since 1922. For political and public services.

=== Baronet ===
- (Robert) Geoffrey Ellis, JP, DL, MP, Member of Parliament for Winchester since October 1931, and for Wakefield City, 1922–23 and 1924–29. For political and public services.
- Sir (Henry) Seymour King, KCIE, Chairman of the Commissioners for the purposes of Income Tax for the City of London.
- Sir (Charles Ernest) Leonard Lyle, JP, Member of Parliament for the Stratford Division of West Ham, December 1918 – 1922, and for Epping Division of Essex, 1923–24. For political, public, and philanthropic services.
- The Right Honourable William Moore, LLD, DL, Lord Chief Justice of Northern Ireland.
- John Gunn Mowat, JP. For public services in the West Riding.
- Major-General Walter Joseph Maxwell Scott, CB, DSO

=== Knight Bachelor ===
- Thomas Martland Ainscough, CBE, His Majesty's Senior Trade Commissioner in India and Ceylon.
- Ronald Wilberforce Allen, Member of Parliament for South Leicester, 1923–24. For political and public services.
- Edward Cuthbert Bairstow, Mus. Doc., FRCO, Master of the Music at York Minster.
- Henry Britten Brackenbury, LLD, MRCS, LRCP, Chairman of the Council of the British Medical Association.
- Vice-Admiral Charles Douglas Carpendale, CB, Controller of the British Broadcasting Corporation. President of the Union Internationale de Radio-Diffusion, 1925–1932.
- The Honourable Evan Edward Charteris, KC, JP, Chairman of Trustees of the National Portrait Gallery. Trustee of the Wallace Collection and of the National Gallery, Millbank.
- William Chree, MA, LLD, KC, Procurator of the Church of Scotland. Dean of the Faculty of Advocates.
- Robert Henry Davis, Governing Director of Messrs. Siebe Gorman & Co. Ltd. Inventor of the Davis Submarine Escape Apparatus and of a Submersible Decompression Chamber for use in deep sea diving.
- Henry Fildes, JP, Member of Parliament for Stockport, 1920–23. For political and public services.
- William John Firth. For political and public services in Surrey.
- William Francis Fladgate, MVO, JP, Chairman of the London Power Company Ltd, and of the Charing Cross Electricity Supply Co. Ltd.
- Leonard Benjamin Franklin, OBE, Member of Parliament for Central Hackney, 1923–24. For political and public services.
- Lieutenant-Colonel Francis Edward Fremantle, OBE, TD, MD, FRCS, JP, DL, MP, Member of Parliament for St. Albans since December 1919. For political and public services.
- Percy Angier Hurd, MP, Member of Parliament for Devizes Division of Wiltshire since 1924, and for Frome, December 1918–23. For political and public services.
- Alexander Malcolm MacEwen, Lately Provost of Inverness. For services to Local Government and Public Health in Scotland.
- James MacFarlane, LLD, DL. For political, public and philanthropic services in Glasgow.
- Alexander Mackintosh, the well-known Lobby and Parliamentary Journalist.
- Robert Ludwig Mond, LLD, FSA, FRSEd, JP, President, Faraday Society, President, Egypt Exploration Society. For public services.
- Ernest Henry Pooley, Clerk to the Drapers' Company since 1908. Treasurer, East London College since 1908.
- Arthur Langford Sholto Rowley, CMG, His Majesty's Consul-General at Paris.
- John Davenport Siddeley, CBE, FRAeS, Chairman and Managing Director of Armstrong Siddeley Motors Ltd. For public services in connection with mechanical development in the Defence Forces.
- William Wright Smith, MA, FRSE, FLS, Regius Professor of Botany in the University of Edinburgh, and Regius Keeper of the Royal Botanic Garden, Edinburgh.
- John Sumner, FSA. For political and public services in the West Midlands.
- Brigadier-General Herbert Conyers Surtees, CB, CMG, DSO, MVO, JP, DL, Member of Parliament for the Gateshead Division, 1918–22. For political and public services in Durham.
- Raymond Unwin, FRIBA, President of the Royal Institute of British Architects. Chief Adviser to the Greater London Regional Town Planning Committee since 1929.
- John Mathewson Watson, JP, Founder and Chairman of the White Heather Fund. For public services in Manchester.
- (George) Ernest White, JP, Lord Mayor of Norwich, 1931–32. For political and public services in Norwich.
- (Arthur) Stanley Woodwark, CMG, CBE, MD, FRCP, JP, DL, Lately Medical Arbitrator for Trade Union and Friendly Societies Insurance Funds. For political and public services.

Dominions

- Albert Cecil Day, CMG, CBE, Official Secretary to the Governor General of the Dominion of New Zealand since 1913.
- William Duffus Hunt. For public services in the Dominion of New Zealand.
- Harold Daniel Luxton, Lord Mayor of the City of Melbourne, 1928–1930. For public services in the State of Victoria.
- Macpherson Robertson. For services in connection with the Antarctic Research Expedition, 1929-1931, and for other public and charitable services in the Commonwealth of Australia.
- Air Commodore Charles Edward Kingsford Smith, MC, AFC. For services to Aviation in the Commonwealth of Australia.

India

- Edward Herbert Kealy, CIE, Indian Civil Service, of the Political Department, Agent to the Governor-General in the States of Western India.
- Thomas Guthrie Russell, Chief Commissioner of Railways.
- Mr. Justice David Grierson Waller, Indian Civil Service, Puisne Judge of the High Court of Judicature at Fort St. George, Madras.
- Rai Bahadur Mr. Justice Lai Gopal Mukharji, Puisne Judge of the High Court of Judicature at Allahabad, United Provinces.
- James Macdonald Dunnett, CIE, Indian Civil Service, Reforms Commissioner, Government of India.
- Howard Denning, CIE, Indian Civil Service, Additional Secretary to the Government of India in the Finance Department.
- John Hugh Ronald Fraser, CIE, OBE, Indian Civil Service, of the Political Department, Judicial Commissioner, North-West Frontier Province.
- Joseph Benjamin George Smith, CIE, Indian Service of Engineers, Chief Engineer and Secretary to the Government of the Punjab in the Public Works Department, Irrigation Branch.
- Colonel Richard Arthur Needham, CIE, DSO, Indian Medical Service (retired).
- Arnold Albert Musto, CIE, MInstCE, Indian Service of Engineers, Superintending Engineer, Lloyd Barrage Circle, Sukkur, Bombay.
- Hormasdyar Phiroz Dastur, Barrister-at-Law, Chief Presidency Magistrate, Bombay.
- Pandit Kailas Narayan Haksar, CIE, Colonel in the Gwalior State Forces and Political Minister, Gwalior State.
- Alfred Henry Watson, Editor of The Statesman, Calcutta, Bengal.

Colonies, Protectorates, &c.

- Albert Ruskin Cook, CMG, OBE, MD. For long and devoted medical work amongst the natives in the Uganda Protectorate.
- Arthur Henry Preece, MICE, MIEE, of the firm of Messrs. Preece, Cardew & Rider, Consulting Engineers to the Crown Agents for the Colonies.
- Joseph Sheridan, Chief Justice of the Tanganyika Territory.
- Mervyn Lawrence Tew, Chief Justice of Sierra Leone.
- Major Hubert Winthrop Young, CMG, DSO, Counsellor to the High Commissioner, Iraq.

=== Order of the Bath ===
==== Knight Grand Cross of the Order of the Bath (GCB) ====
Military Division

- General Sir Charles Fergusson, Bt, GCMG, KCB, DSO, MVO, LLD, (late Grenadier Guards), Retired pay.

Civil Division

- The Right Honourable Rowland Thomas, Earl of Cromer, GCIE, GCVO, Lord Chamberlain.
- The Right Honourable Sir Ronald William Graham, GCMG, GCVO, CB, His Majesty's Ambassador at Rome.

==== Knight Commander of the Order of the Bath (KCB) ====
Military Division

Royal Navy

- Vice-Admiral Frederic Charles Dreyer, CB, OBE.
- Vice-Admiral Frank Larken, CB, CMG.

Army

- Lieutenant-General Basil Ferguson Burnett Hitchcock, CB, DSO, (late The Sherwood Foresters (Nottinghamshire and Derbyshire Regiment)), Half Pay List.
- Lieutenant-General Sir George Darell Jeffreys, KCVO, CB, CMG, (late Grenadier Guards), General Officer Commanding-in-Chief, Southern Command, India.
- Lieutenant-General Henry Edward ap Rhys Pryce, CB, CMG, DSO, Indian Army, Commander, Deccan District, India.

Royal Air Force

- Air Vice-Marshal Tom Ince Webb-Bowen, CB, CMG.

Civil Division

- Edward Hale Tindal Atkinson, CBE, Director of Public Prosecutions.
- Christopher Llewellyn Bullock, CB, CBE, JP, Secretary, Air Ministry.
- Edward Rodolph Forber, CB, CBE, Chairman, Board of Customs and Excise.

==== Companion of the Order of the Bath (CB) ====
Military Division

Royal Navy

- Rear-Admiral Wilfred Frankland French, CMG.
- Rear-Admiral Ragnar Musgrave Colvin, CBE.
- Rear-Admiral the Honourable William Spencer Leveson-Gower, DSO.
- Engineer Rear-Admiral Harold Arthur Brown.

Army

- Major-General Henry Edward Manning Douglas, VC, CMG, DSO, (late Royal Army Medical Corps), Deputy Director of Medical Services, Southern Command, India.
- Major-General Harold Francis Salt, CMG, DSO, (late Royal Artillery), Commander Territorial Army Air Defence Formations.
- Major-General Alan Brough, CMG, CBE, DSO, (late Royal Engineers), Half Pay List.
- Major-General James Keith Dick-Cunyngham, CMG, DSO, (late The Gordon Highlanders), formerly Brigadier, General Staff, Southern Command, India, now Half Pay List.
- Colonel (temporary Brigadier) Mainwaring Ravell Walsh, CMG, MC, (late The Worcestershire Regiment), Brigadier in charge of Administration, Scottish Command.
- Colonel Godfrey Robert Viveash Steward, CBE, DSO, (late The Royal Inniskilling Fusiliers), General Staff Officer, 1st Grade, the British Troops in China.
- Major-General Edward Douglas Giles, CMG, DSO, Indian Army, Major-General, Cavalry, General Staff Branch, Army Headquarters, India.
- Colonel (temporary Brigadier) Henry St. George Stewart Scott, DSO, Indian Army, Commander, Bannu Brigade, India.
- Colonel (temporary Brigadier) Eric de Burgh, DSO, OBE, Indian Army, Commander, 1st (Risalpur) Cavalry Brigade, India.
- Colonel (temporary Brigadier) Henry Lawrence Scott, DSO, MC, Indian Army, Commander, Ambala Brigade Area, India.

Royal Air Force

- Air Vice-Marshal John McIntyre, MC, MB, BCh, KHS.

Civil Division

- Rear-Admiral Percy Lockhart Harnam Noble, CVO.
- Charles Vickery Drysdale, OBE, DSc.
- Lieutenant-Colonel (Honorary Colonel) David Main, VD, Chairman, Territorial Army Association of the County of Cumberland.
- Stuart Kelson Brown, CVO, Joint Secretary, Military Department, India Office.
- The Honourable Alexander Montagu George Cadogan, CMG, Counsellor in His Majesty's Diplomatic Service. Adviser on League of Nations affairs in the Foreign Office.
- Cornelius Joseph Gregg, Secretary to the Board of Inland Revenue.
- Roger Gaskell Hetherington, OBE, MInstCE, Chief Engineering Inspector, Ministry of Health.
- Edward Goldie Howarth, CBE, Accountant-General, Board of Education.
- Hamilton Clelland Marr, MD, CM, FRFPS, Senior Medical Commissioner, General Board of Control for Scotland.
- Frank Horsfall Nixon, Manager, Export Credits Guarantee Department.
- Andrew Denys Stocks, OBE, Legal Adviser and Solicitor, Ministry of Agriculture and Fisheries.

=== Order of the Star of India ===
==== Knight Grand Commander of the Order of the Star of India (GCSI) ====
- Lieutenant-Colonel His Highness Iftikhar-ul-Mulk Sikandar Saulat Nawab Haji Sir Muhammad Hamidullah Khan Bahadur, GCIE, CSI, CVO, Nawab of Bhopal.
- Sir William Malcolm Hailey, GCIE, KCSI, Governor of the United Provinces of Agra and Oudh.

==== Knight Commander of the Order of the Star of India (KCSI) ====
- Khan Bahadur Mian Sir Fazl-i-Hussain, KCIE, Member of the Governor-General's Executive Council.

==== Companion of the Order of the Star of India (CSI) ====
- David George Mitchell, CIE, VD, Indian Civil Service, Joint Secretary and Draftsman to the Government of India in the Legislative Department.
- Douglas Gordon Harris, CIE, Indian Service of Engineers, lately Consulting Engineer to the Government of India.
- Brevet-Colonel Frederic Percival Mackie, OBE, MD, FRCS, FRCP, KHS, Indian Medical Service, Director, Pasteur Institute and Medical Research Institute, Shillong, Assam.

=== Order of Saint Michael and Saint George ===
==== Knight Grand Cross of the Order of St Michael and St George (GCMG) ====
- Sir Donald Charles Cameron, KCMG, KBE, Governor and Commander-in-Chief of Nigeria.
- The Right Honourable Granville George, Earl Granville, GCVO, KCMG, His Majesty's Ambassador Extraordinary and Plenipotentiary at Brussels.
- Sir James William Ronald Macleay, KCMG, His Majesty's Ambassador Extraordinary and Plenipotentiary at Buenos Aires.

==== Knight Commander of the Order of St Michael and St George (KCMG) ====
- Lieutenant-General Sir Thomas Herbert John Chapman Goodwin, KCB, CMG, DSO, Governor of the State of Queensland.
- Lieutenant-Colonel Donald Charles Cameron, CMG, DSO, VD. For public and charitable services in the State of Queensland.
- The Honourable John Alfred Northmore, LLB, Administrator and Chief Justice of the State of Western Australia.
- The Honourable George Edward Rich, Senior Puisne Justice of the High Court of Australia
- Richard Sims Donkin Rankine, CMG, British Resident for the Zanzibar Protectorate.
- Brevet Lieutenant-Colonel Sir George Stewart Symes, KBE, CMG, DSO, Governor and Commander-in-Chief of the Tanganyika Territory.
- John Fitzgerald Brenan, CMG, His Majesty's Consul-General at Shanghai.
- The Honourable Patrick William Maule Ramsay, CMG, His Majesty's Envoy Extraordinary and Minister Plenipotentiary at Athens.

==== Companion of the Order of St Michael and St George (CMG) ====
- Professor James Hight, MA, LittD, Rector of Canterbury College, Christchurch, Dominion of New Zealand.
- Percivale Liesching, Principal, Dominions Office, lately a Secretary in the Office of the High Commissioner in Canada for His Majesty's Government in the United Kingdom.
- Bertram Nicholson, CBE, DSO, MC, Deputy Resident Commissioner and Government Secretary, Swaziland.
- Alexander Dallas Park, Secretary to the Treasury, Dominion of New Zealand.
- Reginald Robert Stuckey, Under Treasurer, State of South Australia.
- Andrew Caldecott, CBE, British Resident, Selangor, Federated Malay States.
- Captain Claude Edward Cookson, Colonial Secretary, Sierra Leone.
- Charles William Leese, Treasurer, Nigeria.
- Henry Charles Donald Cleveland Mackenzie-Kennedy, Chief Secretary to the Government, Northern Rhodesia.
- Brevet Lieutenant-Colonel Gordon Nevil Macready, DSO, OBE, MC, Royal Engineers, Secretary, Oversea Defence Committee.
- Edward Robert Mifsud, OBE, Private Secretary to the Governor and Commander-in-Chief of Malta, Secretary to the Maltese Imperial Government, and Clerk of Councils.
- Major John William Oldfield, OBE, Nominated Member of the State Council, Island of Ceylon. For public services.
- Herbert Cecil Stiebel, OBE, Provincial Commissioner, Tanganyika Territory.
- Frank Arthur Stockdale, CBE, Agricultural Adviser to the Secretary of State for the Colonies.
- Colonel George Badham-Thornhill, DSO, Military Attache at His Majesty's Legation in Peking.
- Harold Edwin Hurst, Director-General of Physical Department, Ministry of Public Works, Egypt.
- George Nicolas Loggin, Director of Works, Sudan Government.
- Evelyn Charles Donaldson Rawlins, CBE, Commercial Counsellor at His Majesty's Legation in Vienna.
- George William Rendel, Counsellor in the Foreign Office.
- Ernest Rowe-Dutton, Financial Adviser to His Majesty's Embassy in Berlin.
- William Strang, Acting Counsellor at His Majesty's Embassy in Moscow.
- William Percy Whitford Turner, OBE, one of His Majesty's Consuls in China.

=== Order of the Indian Empire ===
==== Knight Grand Commander of the Order of the Indian Empire (GCIE) ====
- His Highness Beglar Begi Nawab Bahadur Mir Azam Jan, Khan of Kalat, Baluchistan.
- Major His Highness Maharaja Lokendra Sir Govind Singh Bahadur, KCSI, Maharaja of Datia, Central India.

==== Knight Commander of the Order of the Indian Empire (KCIE) ====
- Sir Arthur Edward Nelson, CIE, OBE, Indian Civil Service, Revenue and Finance Member of the Executive Council of the Governor of the Central Provinces.
- Cecil Hermann Kisch, CB, Secretary, Financial Department, India Office, London.

==== Companion of the Order of the Indian Empire (CIE) ====
- John Carson Nixon, Indian Civil Service, Temporary Joint Secretary to the Government of India in the Finance Department.
- Lodhi Karim Hyder, PhD, Member of the Public Services Commission, Government of India.
- Gilbert Pitcairn Hogg, Indian Civil Service, Commissioner, Burdwan Division, Bengal.
- Colonel (Temporary Brigadier) Neil Charles Bannatyne, Indian Army, Commander, 1st (Abbottabad) Infantry Brigade.
- Alma Latifi, OBE, MA, LLM, LLD, Barrister-at-Law, Indian Civil Service, Commissioner, Punjab.
- Tom Lister, Indian Civil Service, Secretary to the Government of Burma, Reforms Office.
- Claude Henry Gidney, of the Political Department, Secretary to the Government of the North-West Frontier Province.
- Thomas Joseph Alexander Craig, Indian Police Service, Inspector-General of Police, Bengal.
- Robert Daniel Richmond, Indian Forest Service, Chief Conservator of Forests, Madras.
- Colonel Harry Malcolm Mackenzie, MB, ChB (Edin.), DPH (Cantab.), Indian Medical Service, Inspector-General of Civil Hospitals, Punjab.
- Colonel Henry Robert Baynes Reed, DSO, MC, Indian Army, Assistant Adjutant and Quartermaster-General, Burma (Independent) District.
- Ernest Gumming Niven, MInstCE, Chief Engineer, Port Commissioners, Rangoon, Burma.
- Edmund James Rowlandson, Indian Police Service, Commissioner of Police, Madras.
- Roland Graham Gordon, Indian Civil Service, Collector of Nasik, and Political Agent, Surgana, Bombay.
- John Henry Darwin, Indian Civil Service, Magistrate and Collector, United Provinces.
- Sam Carter Mould, Indian Service of Engineers, Superintending Engineer, Rohri Canal Circle, Lloyd Barrage and Canals Construction, Bombay.
- Captain Matthew John Clarke, Indian Army, Deputy Commissioner, Tharrawaddy, Burma.
- Gurunath Venkatesh Bewoor, Indian Civil Service, Postmaster-General, Bombay.
- Lieutenant-Colonel Walter Edwin Beazley, MC, lately Staff Officer to-the Military Adviser-in-Chief Indian States Forces.
- Hugh Dow, Indian Civil Service, Revenue Officer, Lloyd Barrage and Canals Construction, Bombay.
- Khan Bahadur Nabi Bakhsh Mohammad Husain, Bombay Provincial Civil Service, Chief Minister, Bahawalpur State, Punjab.
- Khan Bahadur Shah Muhammad Yahya, Barrister-at-Law, Monghyr, Bihar and Orissa.
- Dhanjibhai Hormusji Mehta, of Naosari, retired Sanitary Commissioner of Baroda State.

=== Imperial Order of the Crown of India ===
- Lady Ali Shah, Mother of His Highness the Aga Khan.

=== Royal Victorian Chain ===
- His Royal Highness The Duke of Gloucester, KG, PC, GCVO.

=== Royal Victorian Order ===
==== Knight Grand Cross of the Royal Victorian Order (GCVO) ====
- Colonel The Right Honourable Sir Clive Wigram, KCB, KCVO, CSI.
- General Sir Bindon Blood, GCB.

==== Knight Commander of the Royal Victorian Order (KCVO) ====
- Rear-Admiral The Honourable Alexander Robert Maule Ramsay, DSO.
- Brigadier-General Sir Charles Wallis King, CB, CMG, CVO.
- Francis Noel Curtis-Bennett, CVO.
- Lieutenant-Colonel John Murray, DSO.
- The Very Reverend Joseph Armitage Robinson, DD.

==== Commander of the Royal Victorian Order (CVO) ====
- Paymaster Rear-Admiral Philip John Hawkins Lander Row, CB.
- Lieutenant-Colonel John Henry Follows, CBE, MVO.
- Lieutenant-Colonel Arthur Faulconer Poulton, CBE.
- Commander Morton Smart, Royal Naval Volunteer Reserve, DSO, MD.
- Major James Ulick Francis Canning Alexander, MVO, OBE.
- Harry Russell Maynard, MVO.

==== Member of the Royal Victorian Order, 4th class (MVO) ====
- Lieutenant-Colonel Alexander Wyndham Malet.
- Major John Lamplugh Wickham.
- The Reverend Robert Robertson Hyde.

==== Member of the Royal Victorian Order, 5th class (MVO) ====
- Sir George Montague Critchett, Bt.
- Captain Robert Harwood.
- Frederick William Barry.

=== Order of the British Empire ===
==== Knight Grand Cross of the Order of the British Empire (GBE) ====
Civil Division

- Sir Robert Gibson, KBE, Chairman of the Commonwealth Bank of Australia. For public services to the Commonwealth of Australia.

==== Dame Grand Cross of the Order of the British Empire (GBE) ====
Civil Division

- Olave St. Clair, Baroness Baden-Powell. For services to the Girl Guide movement.

==== Knight Commander of the Order of the British Empire (KBE) ====
Civil Division

- Wing-Commander Louis Greig, CVO. For public services to many social and welfare organisations.
- John Sydney Wardlaw-Milne, MP, Member of Parliament for the Kidderminster Division of Worcestershire since November 1922. For political and public services.
- Lieutenant-Colonel Hugh Vincent Biscoe, Indian Army, of the Political Department, Resident in the Persian Gulf.

==== Commander of the Order of the British Empire (CBE) ====
Military Division

Royal Navy

- Captain Archibald Campbell Goolden, OBE, (Retired).

Army

- Colonel (temporary Brigadier) George Fleming, DSO, Commander, Shanghai Area, China Command.

Civil Division

- Frederick George Bristow, General Secretary, the Commercial Motor Users Association.
- Alfred William Clapham, OBE, FSA, Technical Editor on the staff of the Royal Commission on Historical Monuments (England). Secretary of the Society of Antiquaries.
- Ernest Salter Davies, MA, Director of Education for the County of Kent.
- Albert Humphries, OBE, MInstCE, MIMechE, MISI, Chief Mechanical Engineer and Building Works Superintendent, Royal Ordnance Factories, Woolwich.
- James Stuart Jones, MBE, Controller, Central Telegraph Office, General Post Office.
- Eleanor Constance Lodge, MA, DLitt, FRHistS. Until recently Principal of Westfield College, University of London.
- William Robert Maconkey, Comptroller and Auditor-General, Northern Ireland.
- Lieutenant-Colonel Pulteney Malcolm, DSO, MVO, Chief Constable of Cheshire.
- James Arnold Newrick. Lately Chairman of the Approved Societies Consultative Council.
- Joseph Sinclair Nicholson, Assistant Secretary, Ministry of Labour.
- Russell John Reynolds, MB, BS, MRCS, LRCP, DMRE, Honorary Adviser in Radiology to the Ministry of Pensions.
- Robert Shirley Shuckburgh, Joint Assistant Public Trustee.
- Albert Harry Smethurst, General Secretary of the Amalgamated Engineering Union.
- Helen Gregory Smith, RRC, President, Scottish Matrons Association. President, Benevolent Fund for Nurses in Scotland. For services to the nursing profession in Scotland.
- Austin Edward Arthur Watt Smyth, Librarian, House of Commons.
- Reginald George Stapledon, MBE, MA, Professor of Agricultural Botany, University College of Wales, Aberystwyth. Director of the Welsh Plant Breeding Association.
- Elizabeth Ann Tweedale, ARRC, JP, Dame of Grace of the Order of St. John, Lady District Superintendent of No. 4 District of the St. John Ambulance Brigade.
- Robert Townsend Warner, Secretary, Development Commission.
- Frederick Horton Wynne, His Majesty's Deputy Chief Inspector of Mines.
- Henry Forster Handley-Derry, one of His Majesty's Consuls in China.
- Rupert Edward Francis Fawkes, Chief Mechanical Engineer, Sudan Government Railways.
- Alexander Knox Helm, OBE, one of His Majesty's Consuls, Levant Service.
- Richard Valentine Laming, OBE, Commercial Secretary (Grade I) at His Majesty's Legation at The Hague.
- Brigadier-General George Henry Dean, VD. For services to the Rifle Club movement in the Commonwealth of Australia.
- Alice Mabel Maud Emmerton, OBE. For public and charitable services in the Commonwealth of Australia.
- George McNamara, Secretary, Post and Telegraph Department, Dominion of New Zealand.
- Brigadier-General John Jackson Paine, VD, Honorary Treasurer of the Commonwealth Council of Rifle Associations, Commonwealth of Australia.
- William Joseph James Short, General Manager of the Bureau of Central Sugar Mills and Chairman of the Sugar Board, State of Queensland.
- John Howard Vaughan. For public services in the Commonwealth of Australia.
- Frank Arthur Verney, OBE, FRCVS, Principal Veterinary Officer, Basutoland.
- Frederick William Wheatley, DSc, lately Senior Educational Officer of the Royal Australian Naval Service.
- Norman Frederick Peck, Indian Civil Service, Magistrate and Collector, Bihar and Orissa.
- Oliver Harold Baptist Starte, Indian Civil Service, Criminal Tribes Settlement Officer, Bombay.
- Lieutenant-Colonel Alfred Lethbridge, Indian Army, Deputy Inspector-General of Military Police, Burma.
- Rai Bahadur Munshi Man Singh, Indian Police Service, Superintendent of Police, United Provinces.
- Arnold Savage Bailey, Unofficial Member of the Federal Council of the Federated Malay States. For public services.
- Douglas William Gumbley, OBE, ISO, Inspector-General, Posts and Telegraphs, and Director of Civil Aviation, Ministry of Economics and Communications, Iraq.
- Percy James Kelly, MB, Surgeon General, British Guiana.
- Keith Ravenscroft Tucker, Treasurer, Nyasaland.
- Major Andrew Barkworth Wright, MC, Chief Assistant Secretary, Cyprus. For services while acting as Colonial Secretary during the disturbances in Cyprus in October 1931.

==== Officer of the Order of the British Empire (OBE) ====
Military Division

Royal Navy

- Captain John McKellar Robertson, VD, ADC, Royal Naval Volunteer Reserve.

Army

- Captain (local Lieutenant-Colonel) Desmond Harry Adair, The Royal Scots Greys, attached Sudan Defence Force.
- Lieutenant-Colonel (Quarter-Master) Arthur Barker, MC, DCM, Extra Regimentally Employed List.
- Temporary Major Ernest Kenneth Campbell, MB, FRCS, Royal Army Medical Corps.
- Temporary Major Hugh Davies-Colley, FRCS, Royal Army Medical Corps.
- Lieutenant-Colonel and Brevet Colonel George Reginald Curtis, TD, retired, late Territorial Army.
- Major Richard Charles Earl, VD, late Officer Commanding, Bermuda Volunteer Rifle Corps.
- Lieutenant-Colonel and Brevet Colonel Thomas Frederick Ellison, 53rd (City of London) Anti-Aircraft Brigade, Royal Artillery, Territorial Army.
- Lieutenant-Colonel Neville John Acland Foster, MC, Officer Commanding State Troops Negri Sembilan, Federated Malay States Volunteer Force.
- Captain Harold Augustus Freeman, MC, 1st Battalion, The Royal Welch Fusiliers.
- Lieutenant-Colonel Arthur Leslie Irvine Friend, MC, 11th Hussars (Prince Albert's Own).
- Captain Frederick Richard Gifford, 2nd Battalion, 10th Gurkha Rifles, Indian Army, Translation Officer, General Staff Branch, Army Headquarters.
- Lieutenant (local Major) Percy Travers Goodwin, Regular Army Reserve of Officers, Company Commander, Trans-Jordan Frontier Force.
- Captain Charles Grimshaw, Royal Army Pay Corps.
- Captain John Theodore Harley, TD, The Leicestershire Regiment.
- Major Benjamin Charles William Johnson, Territorial Army Reserve of Officers.
- Major Herbert Johnson, 61st Carnarvon and Denbigh (Yeomanry) Brigade, Royal Artillery, Territorial Army.
- Major and Brevet Lieutenant-Colonel Jeremy Taylor Marsh, CMG, retired pay, late Royal Army Service Corps.
- Captain William Edward Parnell, Regular Army Reserve of Officers, attached Iraq Levies.
- Major John Walter Julian Raikes, Royal Engineers.
- Lieutenant-Colonel and Brevet Colonel William Herbert Rogers, Surrey Group, Anti-Aircraft Searchlight Companies, Royal Engineers, Territorial Army.
- Lieutenant-Colonel (Quarter-Master) Ernest Smith, MC, Extra Regimentally Employed List.
- Major (local Lieutenant-Colonel) Frederic Sherman Steed, DCM, Quarter-Master, retired pay, Chief Recruiting Officer, Eastern Zone, Chelmsford.
- Lieutenant-Colonel Henry William Wiebkin, MC, retired pay, late Royal Artillery.
- Lieutenant-Colonel and Brevet Colonel Edgar William Wilkinson, TD, Territorial Army Reserve of Officers.

Civil Division

- Edmund Rushworth Abbott, lately Clerk to the Ruislip-Northwood Urban District Council.
- Margaret Anderson, Lady Superintendent, East End Maternity Hospital.
- William Austin Balls, Past Master of the Worshipful Company of Bakers of the City of London. For public services.
- Marion Brodie Blackie, Chairman of the Executive Committee of the Scottish Council for Women's Trades, President of the Women's Friendly Society for Scotland.
- Arthur Sparkes Cotton, Principal, Scottish Office.
- Arthur Sambell Cox, Superintending Examiner, Patent Office, Board of Trade.
- Charles Mortimer Cuttle, Superintending Inspector, Board of Customs and Excise.
- Arthur James Dawe, Principal, Colonial Office.
- Edward Vincent Emery, Director of Printing and Binding, His Majesty's Stationery Office.
- Frederick William Emery, FRCVS, Chief Veterinary Officer, Ministry of Agriculture, Northern Ireland.
- Arthur Benjamin Hart, MIEE, Assistant Engineer-in-Chief, General Post Office.
- Captain Reginald Haworth, Chief Accountant (France and Belgium), Imperial War Graves Commission.
- Edward John Hayward, Clerk to the Cardiff Justices. A member of the Probation Advisory Committee.
- William Henderson, MBE, Controller, Statistical Office, Board of Customs and Excise.
- Albert Mayon Henshaw, MInstCE, MIME, JP. For many years a Central Examiner to the Board for Mining Examinations, Mines Department, and a member of the Safety in Mines Research Board.
- Maud Mary Jeffery, Agent for the Commissioners of Crown Lands. Founder and President of the Octavia Hill Club. For services in the training of women for the work of estate management.
- Ethel Mary Le Plastrier, Superintendent, Money Order Department, General Post Office.
- Matthew Joseph Martin, Chief Constable of Perth and Kinross.
- Eleanor Melville, JP. For political and public services in Warwickshire.
- Ralph Stransham Oldham, MD, BCh, Principal Medical Officer, Ministry of Pensions.
- Major James Parsons, TD, JP. For many years Chairman of the Great Berkhampstead Urban District Council. For public services in Berkhampstead and district.
- Thomas Hedley Phillips, MBE, Commandant, Metropolitan Special Constabulary.
- Councillor William Alexander Platt, MBE, JP, Chairman of the Bury, Rawtenstall and District War Pensions Committee.
- William Isaac Quinn, Secretary to the Belfast City and District Water Commissioners.
- Ernest Alexander Rahles Rahbula, MC, FSA, ARIBA. A Senior Investigator on the Staff of the Royal Commission on Historical Monuments (England).
- Henry Alexander Russell, MBE, Principal, His Majesty's Office of Works and Public Buildings.
- Lizzie Godwin Salt, MA, Headmistress, Bromley County (Secondary) School for Girls.
- John Edward Scanlan, JP. For political and public services in Newcastle upon Tyne.
- George Shearing, BSc, MIEE, Principal Scientific Officer, Naval Signal School, Portsmouth.
- Fraser Story, FRSE, Education and Publications Officer, Forestry Commission.
- Mary Beatrice Stuart, Chairman of the Scottish Women's Liberal Council. For political and public services.
- Elizabeth Sarah Louise Thomas. For political and public services in South Wales.
- John Edward Tory, FSI, Superintending Valuer, Board of Inland Revenue.
- William Wilkinson, Principal, Blackburn Municipal Technical College.
- Blanche Eleanor Anne Wright, Honorary Matron and Founder of the Wright-Kingsford Home for Children.
- Edward Barclay, a British resident in Paris.
- Herbert Alfred Newton Bluett, Commercial Agent at His Majesty's Consulate-General at Batavia.
- Major James John Bramble, Royal Marines (Retired), District Commissioner, Sudan Political Service.
- Captain Henry Cecil Edward Jebb, Director of Stores and Ordnance, Sudan Government.
- Arthur Henry William King, His Majesty's Consul at Lisbon.
- John Charles Sidley, chartered accountant, Cairo.
- Laurence Barton Grafftey-Smith, Assistant Oriental Secretary to His Majesty's High Commission at Cairo.
- Robert Connell, Commissioner of Police, State of Western Australia.
- George Richard Hobson. For public services in Basutoland.
- M. R. Ry. Rao Bahadur Mangalore Kesava Pai Avargal, Director, Tuberculosis Institute, and Superintendent, Tuberculosis Hospital, Madras.
- Major Ronald William Barker, Indian Army, Deputy Commissioner, Insein, Burma.
- William Louis Barretto, Deputy Commissioner, Pyapon District, Burma.
- U San Baw, President, Karen National Society, Tharrawaddy and Prome Districts, Burma.
- Harry Ewart Flint, Indian Forest Service, Deputy Conservator of Forests, Burma.
- Marcar Sheridon Gregory, MC, VD, Indian State Railways, Chief Personnel Officer, North-Western Railway, Lahore.
- U On Gyaw, TDM, Indian Police Service, District Superintendent of Police, Tharrawaddy, Burma.
- Khan Bahadur Risaldar Moghul Baz Khan, IDSM, Assistant Political Officer, Khyber, North-West Frontier Province.
- Rao Bahadur Maneklal Lallubhai, Assistant Collector of Salt Revenue, Thana Range, Bombay.
- Frederick Thomas Morehead, Indian Forest Service, Deputy Conservator of Forests, Insein, Burma.
- Sardar Bahadur Balwant Singh Puri, Assistant Secretary of the Indian Red Cross Society and the St. John Ambulance Association, and Honorary Secretary of the British Empire Leprosy Relief Association, Indian Council.
- John Keith Stanford, MC, Indian Civil Service, Deputy Commissioner, Henzada, Burma.
- Charles Winter Scott, DFC, Indian Forest Service, Forest Economist to the Government of Burma.
- Clyne Garden Stewart, Indian Police Service, District Superintendent of Police, Burma.
- Major David Rees Thomas, MB, ChB. (Edin.), Indian Medical Service, Chemical Examiner to the Government of the Punjab.
- Eric Charles Bendyshe Walton, Hydro-Electric Engineer, United Provinces.
- Arthur John Stanley White, Indian Civil Service, Deputy Commissioner, Thayetmyo, Burma.
- George William Murray Woods, Indian Forest Service, Burma.
- Cecil James Juxon Talbot Barton, District Officer, Kenya.
- Seemampillai Francis Chellappah, Senior Medical Officer of Health, Ceylon.
- Andrew Connal, MD, lately of the West African Medical Staff. For services as Deputy Director, Laboratory Service, Nigeria.
- Altamont Ernest Da Costa, MBE, Elected Member of the Legislative Council, and Custos of Kingston, Jamaica. For public services.
- Francis Dias, Nominated Unofficial Member of the Executive Council and Elected Member of the Legislative Council of British Guiana. For public services.
- William Gemmel Fairweather, AMICE, Director of Surveys, Northern Rhodesia.
- Captain Arthur Marlay Floury, Commissioner of Paphos District, Cyprus. For services during the disturbances in Cyprus in October 1931.
- George Edwin Palmer Gentle, Superintendent of Public Works, Grenada, Windward Islands.
- Henry Joseph King, President of the Chamber of Commerce, Gibraltar. For public services.
- Sydney Moody, Assistant Secretary, Palestine.
- Hugh Brindley Owen, DSO, MB, East African Medical Service, Medical Superintendent and Principal, Medical School, Mulago, Uganda Protectorate.
- John Robertson, Dredging Superintendent, Port of Basrah Directorate, Ministry of Finance, Iraq.
- Reginald Edwin Robins, Assistant Superintendent of the Line, Kenya and Uganda Railways and Harbours.
- Major Alan Saunders, MC, Deputy Commandant of Police, Palestine.
- Harry Chapman Sinderson, MD, Dean, Royal College of Medicine, and Physician, Royal Hospital, Ministry of the Interior, Iraq.
- Thomas Whitfield, Unofficial Member of the Legislative Council of the Gold Coast Colony. For public services.

==== Member of the Order of the British Empire (MBE) ====
Military Division

Royal Navy

- Paymaster Lieutenant (S) John Patrick Canty, DSM.
- Commissioned Wardmaster Garnet Hughes.
- Superintending Clerk Samuel Halliwell, Royal Marines.

Army

- Lieutenant (Quarter-Master) William Henry Albutt, DCM, Depot, The Royal Welch Fusiliers.
- Captain (Quarter-Master) Albert William Andrews, DCM, Depot, The Buffs (East Kent Regiment).
- Margaret Ashmore, Sister, Queen Alexandra's Imperial Military Nursing Service (Reserve).
- No. 1851264 Warrant Officer, Class I, Superintending Clerk, John Henry Barton, Royal Engineers.
- No. 7868331 Warrant Officer, Class II, Quartermaster-Sergeant Instructor, Reginald Horace Arthur Beales, Royal Tank Corps.
- Regimental Quartermaster-Sergeant Samuel Cecil Bell, late Bermuda Volunteer Rifle Corps.
- No. S/8842 Warrant Officer, Class I, Staff Sergeant-Major John Richard Boxall, DCM, Royal Army Service Corps.
- No. 3511072 Warrant Officer, Class II, Regimental Quartermaster-Sergeant William Henry Christy, DCM, 5th Battalion, The Manchester Regiment, Territorial Army.
- Lieutenant and Assistant Inspector of Armourers Francis Thomas Comerford, Royal Army Ordnance Corps.
- No. S/753 Warrant Officer, Class I, 1st Class Staff Sergeant-Major James Macrow Connolly, Royal Army Service Corps.
- Lieutenant (Quarter-Master) John Cook, Depot, Scots Guards.
- No. 6837400 Regimental Sergeant-Major Instructor William Crofts, Indian Unattached List, Army School of Physical Training, Ambala, India.
- Lieutenant (Quarter-Master) Clifford Roland Davis, 5th Battalion, The Somerset Light Infantry (Prince Albert's), Territorial Army.
- No. 724545 Warrant Officer, Class II, Battery Sergeant-Major Samuel Joseph Denchfield, DCM, 249th Field Battery, Royal Artillery, Territorial Army.
- No. 1402438 Warrant Officer, Class I, Sergeant-Major Artillery Clerk Charles Henry Eaton, Royal Artillery.
- Captain (Quarter-Master) Alexander Gibb, Depot, The Argyll and Sutherland Highlanders (Princess Louise's).
- No. 1660464 Warrant Officer, Class II, Battery Sergeant-Major Harry Girling, Suffolk Heavy Brigade, Royal Artillery, Territorial Army.
- No. 6972774 Warrant Officer, Class I, Bandmaster Charles William Griggs, 2nd Battalion, The Queen's Own Cameron Highlanders.
- Captain Hubert Arthur Hamilton, Royal Artillery, Commandant, Bermuda Militia Artillery.
- No. 536864 Warrant Officer, Class I, Regimental Sergeant-Major Frederick Albert Hannam, DCM, 15th/19th Hussars.
- No. 7109095 Warrant Officer, Class II, Company Sergeant-Major (acting Regimental Sergeant-Major) Francis Hargadon, The South Wales Borderers, attached The Monmouthshire Regiment, Territorial Army.
- No. 7245432 Warrant Officer, Class I, Sergeant-Major Robert Edward Harvey, DCM, Royal Army Medical Corps.
- No. 1401020 Warrant Officer, Class I, Sergeant-Major Artillery Clerk, now Lieutenant (District Officer), Albert Edward Hazell, Royal Artillery.
- Captain Bertram Lawrence Herdon, Indian Army Reserve of Officers, employed Signal Training Battalion, Signal Training Centre, India.
- Warrant Officer, Class II, Company Sergeant-Major John Higgins, Iraq Levies.
- No. 1852195 Warrant Officer, Class I, Staff Sergeant-Major Albert James Martin Hill, Royal Army Service Corps.
- No. 2972002 Warrant Officer, Class II, Regimental Quartermaster-Sergeant James Hosie, 9th Battalion, The Argyll and Sutherland Highlanders (Princess Louise's), Territorial Army.
- Lieutenant (Quarter-Master) James Henry Hunt, Royal Army Medical Corps, Territorial Army.
- Lieutenant Arthur James Jarman, The Prince of Wales's Volunteers (South Lancashire).
- Gwendoline Maud Jones, ARRC, Sister, Queen Alexandra's Imperial Military Nursing Service.
- Subadar-Major and Honorary Lieutenant Kehar Singh, Indian Army Service Corps, Instructor, Mechanical Transport, Depot, Chaklala, India.
- Major Henry Joseph King, Special List of Quartermasters, 10th Battalion, 20th Burma Rifles, Indian Army.
- No. 5877142 Warrant Officer, Class II, Company Sergeant-Major William Langton, 4th Battalion, The Northamptonshire Regiment, Territorial Army.
- No. 4435229 Warrant Officer, Class I, Regimental Sergeant-Major Cyril Herbert Makeham, late 1st Battalion, The Durham Light Infantry.
- No. 7574452 Warrant Officer, Class I, Sub-Conductor Henry Arthur Miles, Royal Army Ordnance Corps.
- No. 1407197 Warrant Officer, Class I, Experimental Sergeant-Major Frederick Peck, DCM, Royal Artillery.
- Major (Commissary) Joseph Piper, Indian Miscellaneous List, Officer Supervisor, Military Secretary's Branch, Army Headquarters.
- No. 1852658 Warrant Officer, Class II, Company Sergeant-Major (acting Regimental Sergeant-Major) Harry Alfred Poole, late Royal Engineers, attached, Royal Engineers Supplementary Reserve.
- No. S/27003 Warrant Officer, Class II, Staff Quartermaster-Sergeant Walter Wilson Rixon, Royal Army Service Corps, Territorial Army.
- No. 1850797 Warrant Officer, Class II (Education), Edmund Reginald Rogerson, Army Educational Corps.
- Captain (Quarter-Master) Peter Shaw, 2nd Battalion, The Highland Light Infantry (City of Glasgow Regiment).
- No. 1851053 Warrant Officer, Class I, Superintending Clerk Alfred Robert Shearman, Royal Engineers.
- The Reverend William John Sym, BD, Chaplain to the Forces (4th Class), Royal Army Chaplains Department, Territorial Army.
- No. 4736064 Warrant Officer, Class II, Regimental Quartermaster-Sergeant, Fitz Walter Turton, The Hallamshire Battalion, The York and Lancaster Regiment, Territorial Army.
- No. 2306288 Warrant Officer, Class I, Superintending Clerk, John Thursby Wigglesworth, Royal Corps of Signals.
- No. 1851489 Warrant Officer, Class I, Superintending Clerk, George Alfred Woolgar, Royal Engineers.
- Major (Commissary) Alexander Wyatt, Indian Miscellaneous List, Officer Supervisor, Adjutant General's Branch, Army Headquarters.

Royal Air Force

- Flight Lieutenant Andrew MacGregor, DFC.
- Flight Lieutenant Bernard William Hemsley.
- Flying Officer Thomas Ewart Guttery.

Civil Division

- Councillor George William Allinson, Vice-Chairman of the Kettering Local Employment Committee.
- Kathleen Mary Lottie Barrett, Superintendent, Typist Staff, War Office.
- Sydney Charles Bartholomew, MIEE, Assistant Staff Engineer, General Post Office.
- Jean Evelyn Batten, Chairman of the Juvenile Advisory Committee of the Borough Employment Exchange.
- Ethel Mary Bennett, JP, Chairman of the Children's Sub-Committee of the Salisbury, Trowbridge and District War Pensions Committee.
- Robert Ivor Brenton, Chief Registrar, Air Ministry.
- William Yabsley Bridgman, Staff Officer, Civil Engineer-in-Chief's Department, Admiralty.
- Albert Robert Harris Cass, Assistant Postmaster, Bristol.
- Frederick James Caswell, Superintending Clerk, Board of Control.
- Edward Leopold Cheeseman, Clerk to the Right Honourable Sir William Allen Jowitt, KC, lately Attorney General.
- Charles Robert Clark, Superintendent, Metropolitan Police.
- Herbert Edgar Clark, Senior Executive Officer, Board of Customs and Excise.
- Frank Stride Collins, Clerical Officer, Cabinet Secretariat. For services in connection with the Round Table Conference.
- Temperance Davey, Higher Executive Officer, Ministry of Labour.
- Thomas Richard Evans, Inspector of Meat and Foods under the Cardiff City Council.
- Albert Victor French, Registrar, Clearing Office for Enemy Debts, Board of Trade.
- Frank Grant, Staff Officer, Empire Marketing Board.
- Edgar Gunning, Higher Executive Officer, Ministry of Commerce, Northern Ireland.
- Captain the Honourable Ivan Josslyn Lumley Hay, Commandant, Metropolitan Special Constabulary.
- Winifred Howard, Organiser to the Scottish Women's Rural Institutes (Central Area).
- Reginald Bray Hunter, Officer, Board of Customs and Excise.
- William Richard Johnson, ASAA, Higher Executive Officer, Registry of Friendly Societies.
- Charles Percival Keenan, Inspector, London County Council Mental Hospital at Bexley, Kent.
- Horace Thomas Knott, Controller, Horsham Centre, Observer Corps (West Sussex Special Constabulary).
- Alderman Thomas William Lack, JP, Chairman of the Chesterfield and District War Pensions Committee.
- Blanche Langton, Chairman of the Children's Sub-Committee of the Shoreditch and Bethnal Green War Pensions Committee.
- Robson Leonard Layfield. His Majesty's Inspector of Horses in Mines.
- Henry George Lewis, Examiner of Technical Accounts, Engineer-in-Chief's Department, Admiralty.
- Duncan Livingstone, Second Class Officer, Ministry of Labour.
- George McDiarmid, Waterguard Superintendent, First Class, Board of Customs and Excise.
- John Leslie MacGregor, Assistant Engineer, Grade I, His Majesty's Office of Works and Public Buildings.
- Alfred Mitchell, Staff Clerk, War Office.
- David Phillip Parry, Superintendent, Montgomery County Constabulary.
- Walter Richard Perks. His Majesty's Immigration Inspector at Dover.
- Lucy Agnes Ratcliffe, Superintendent, West Sussex County Nursing Association.
- Francis Rayment, DCM, Headmaster, Hertingfordbury Church of England School, Hertfordshire.
- William James Rich, JP, Chairman of the Barrow, Ulverston and District War Pensions Committee.
- Paymaster Lieutenant-Commander Alexander Robertson, Royal Naval Reserve (Retd.), Clerk to the Traffic Commissioners for the Southern Area of Scotland.
- Alexander Ramsay Ross, Staff Officer (Taxes), Board of Inland Revenue.
- Robert Ross, Senior Staff Officer, Ministry of Agriculture and Fisheries.
- Albert James Southam, JP. A member of the National Savings Committee. Honorary Secretary of the Ashford, Kent, Local Savings Committee.
- Major John Stewart, TD, FRIBA, Architect to the Lanarkshire Education Authority.
- Louisa Le Teller Swann, Headmistress, London County Council, Columbia Road Juniors Girls School, Bethnal Green.
- Arthur Tattersfield, Superintendent, Wakefield City Police.
- Amelia Susan Thompson, LLA, Headmistress, Cowley Girls Council School, St. Helens, Lancashire.
- James Arthur Barnard Townsend, Clerk to the Attorney General.
- Hannah Weir, State Registered Nurse, Superintendent of Health Visitors in Northumberland.
- Richard John Wood, Chairman of the Central Schools Committee at the City of London Employment Exchange.
- Robert Wallace Wright, Parliamentary Clerk, India Office.
- Hugh Albert-Boyle, Chief Sanitary Inspector, Sudan Medical Service.
- Dorothea O'Neill Daunt, British Subjects in Russia Relief Association.
- Bimbashi Frank Harvey, Inspector, Suez Police.
- Mary Christian Howden Archivist at His Majesty's Legation at Berne.
- Alexander Marshall, Superintendent, Bacteriological Laboratories Section, Wellcome Tropical Research Laboratories, Khartoum.
- John Kingston O'Donoghue, Archivist at His Majesty's Embassy at Berlin.
- Francis Michie Shepherd, His Majesty's Consul at Hamburg.
- David Fisher, Member of the Retail Grocers and Retail Bakers Advisory Sub-committees of the Empire Marketing Board. For services to Empire Trade.
- Gladys Grace Maasdorp. For Child Welfare services in Southern Rhodesia.
- Joseph Anthony Croning, Confidential Assistant to the Political Resident in the Persian Gulf.
- Stanley Clifford Davies, Deputy Assistant Controller of Military Accounts, Eastern Command, Meerut, United Provinces.
- Douglas William D'Silva, Burma Forest Service, Extra Assistant Conservator of Forests, Burma.
- U Kyan Hlaing, TDM, Burma Police Service, Deputy Superintendent of Police, Northern Range, Flying Squad, Meiktila, Burma.
- Otto Eric Conrad Judd, Deputy Director of Surveys, Bihar and Orissa.
- Walter Kaing, Officer in charge No. 2 Karen Irregulars, Burma.
- Henry Kavanagh, Timber Assistant, Forest Department, Burma.
- Regimental Sergeant-Major Frederick Charles Lay, MC, 25th Indian Mountain Brigade, Royal Artillery.
- Roland Frank Leitch, Burma Frontier Service, Assistant Superintendent, Tharrawaddy, Burma.
- Thomas Henry Norris, Station Master, Peshawar Cantonment, North-West Frontier Province.
- U Paik, TDM, Burma Police Service, Sub-divisional Police Officer, Tharrawaddy North, Burma.
- Charles Sigismund Schmit, lately Chairman, Municipal Council, Kodaikanal, Madura District, Madras.
- Subedar Bhim Singh, Malwa Bhil Corps, Indore, Central India.
- Honorary Major Hoshiar Singh, Bahadur, Senior Vice-Chairman, District Board, Ludhiana, Punjab.
- Cyril Sherrard Smith, Postmaster, Cawnpore.
- Cissie Cooray. For social welfare services in Ceylon.
- Cyril Eugene Corry, Inspecting Officer of Police, Ministry of the Interior, Iraq.
- Joseph Oliver Cutteridge, Assistant Director of Education and Chief Inspector of Schools, Colony of Trinidad and Tobago.
- Peter de Abrew. For services to education in Ceylon.
- St. Yves Daniel de Verteuil, Warden, Eastern Counties, Colony of Trinidad and Tobago.
- Michael Christofi Kareklas, Local Commandant of Police, Cyprus. For services during the disturbances in Cyprus in October 1931.
- The Reverend Charles Athanasius Everett Macaulay, African Assistant Director of Education, Sierra Leone.
- Hannah Florence Skinner, Headmistress of Belilios Public School, Hong Kong.
- James Sowray, late Chairman of the Portsmouth Town Board, Dominica, Leeward Islands. For public services.
- George Edward Thornton, Commissioner of Income Tax, Northern Rhodesia.
- Esmailjee Jivanjee Yusufali, Unofficial Member of the Legislative Council, Zanzibar. For public services.
- Zacharias Constantinou Zardis, District Medical Officer, Second Grade, Cyprus. For services during the disturbances in Cyprus in October 1931.

Honorary Members

- Aref Effendi el Aref, District Officer, Palestine.
- Nagib Habash Collector of Customs, Palestine.
- Hugh Martin Kayamba, Chief Clerk, Provincial Administration, Tanganyika Territory.
- Mohamed Said Bey el Yusef, of the Arab Legion, Trans-Jordan.
- Sheikh Tahir bin Abu baker el Amawi, Kathi (Arab Judge), Zanzibar.

=== Medal of the Order of the British Empire ===
For Meritorious Service.

Military Division

Royal Navy

- Thomas George Lockyer, Stoker Petty Officer (now Chief Stoker) O.N. P/K 59658. (HMS London).
- Francis William Wallace, Corporal, Royal Marines, Ply/22562. (HMS Colombo).
- Lionel Cecil Nelson Poole, Leading Seaman, O.N. P/J 48225. (HMS London).

Army

- No. 3950154 Sergeant (acting Company Sergeant-Major Instructor) James Reuben Carlisle, The Welch Regiment, attached Federated Malay States Volunteer Force.
- No. 4180608 Sergeant Cyril Clemence, 1st Battalion, The Royal Welch Fusiliers.
- No. 2208107 Staff Sergeant Thomas Henry Gerald Green, 52nd (London) Anti-Aircraft Brigade, Royal Artillery, Territorial Army.
- No. 7681089 Sergeant (temporary Squadron Sergeant Major) Wilfred Stanley Barman, Military Mounted Police.
- No. 7258040 Private Frederick Walter Percy, No. 1 Company, Royal Army Medical Corps.
- No. 2308849 Sergeant Harold Victor Watley, Royal Corps of Signals.
- Shawish (Sergeant) Lasito Onwal, Equatorial Corps, Sudan Defence Force.

Royal Air Force

- 348973 Leading Aircraftman Edward Watts.

Civil Division

- Edward Arthur Le Count, Constable, Metropolitan Police.
- William Albert Pinker, Foreman of Masons, British Museum.
- Albert Roberts, Head Gardener, Imperial War Graves Commission.
- Gilbert Roscoe Saville. For services in connection with the capture of an armed burglar at Whitfield, near Bury, Lancashire.
- Hector Boothby Tomlinson, Constable, Warwickshire Constabulary.
- Mohammed Abu Bakr, Sol (Warrant Officer), Sudan Veterinary Police.
- Mustafa Ahmed Hamadto, Steamer Engineer, Sudan Government Steamers.
- George Mishrigi, Chief Clerk, Mechanical Department, Sudan Government Railways, Wadi Halfa.
- Jimed Saleh, Bash Shawish (Sergeant-Major), Haifa Province Police, Sudan.
- Kleanthi Ioannou Tsestos, Corporal, Cyprus Military Police.
- Kang Sin Yew, Detective Sub-Inspector, Federated Malay States Police.
- Antonios Stavrou Zachariades, Inspector of Machinery and Plant, Forest Department, Cyprus. For services during the disturbances in Cyprus in October 1931.

=== Companion of the Imperial Service Order (ISO) ===
Home Civil Service

- Francis William Bickle, Principal Surveyor for Tonnage, Board of Trade.
- William Gaskell, Chief Clerk, Factory Department, Home Office.
- Frederick Thomas Green, Vice-Controller, London Postal Service.
- Alfred Fitzgerald Hart, Principal Clerk, Principal Probate Registry.
- Thomas Sydney Owen, Senior Staff Clerk, Ministry of Labour.
- Henry Edward Treharne Rees, Architect, HM Office of Works and Public Buildings.

Dominions

- Joseph Edward Broadbent, Parliamentary Draftsman, State of Queensland.
- William Nevin Tatlow Hurst, Secretary for Lands, Lands and Surveys Department, State of Tasmania.
- Edward Parkes, Under Secretary, Chief Electoral Officer and Clerk to the Executive Council, State of Tasmania.

Indian Civil Services

- M. R. Ry. Rao Bahadur Rama Rao Krishna Rao Bhonsle Avargal, Secretary to the Commissioner for Government Examinations, Madras.
- Christopher Beadnell Beadnell, Deputy Commissioner of Excise, Madras.
- Eustace Heath William Beale, Burma Police Service, Personal Assistant to the Inspector-General of Police, Burma.
- Cajetan Francis Borges, Bombay Civil Service, Assistant Secretary to the Government of Bombay in the Home Department.
- Rai Sahib Nelson Charles Bose, MBE, Confidential Assistant to His Excellency the Governor of Bengal.
- Charles Antony Disney, Deputy Superintendent, Government Printing, Punjab.
- William Gawke, Examiner, Local Funds Accounts, United Provinces.
- John Athanasius Quiterio, Superintendent, Rajputana Agency Office, Rajputana.
- Cecil Charles Ryan, Superintendent, Walton Training School, Lahore, Punjab.
- James Edward Walsh, MBE, Officer Supervisor, Engineer-in-Chief's Branch, Army Headquarters.

Colonies, Protectorates, &c.

- George Percy Cuscaden, Deputy Commissioner of Police, Selangor, Federated Malay States.
- Albert Barrow Dillon, Inspector of Schools, British Honduras.
- Lionel Bastiampillai Emmanuel, Office Assistant to the Director of Public Works, Ceylon.
- Arthur Heyliger Hill, Immigration Agent General, British Guiana.
- Frederick England Johnson, Treasurer and Collector of Customs and Registrar of Shipping, British Solomon Islands Protectorate.
- George Howard King, Postmaster of the Presidency of Saint Christopher and Nevis, Leeward Islands.
- Cyril Leach, Director of Secondary Schools, Malta.
- Cyril Edward Spencer, Commissioner of Prisons, Kenya.
- Ratu Penijimini Veli, Roko Tui Macuata, Fiji.
- George Alexander Walker, Traffic Manager and Store Keeper, Kowloon–Canton Railway, Hong Kong.

=== Imperial Service Medal ===
In recognition of long and meritorious service.

- Abdul Barick, Record Sorter in the Imperial Record Department.
- Babu Lai Behari Dutta, Treasury Potdar (Shroff), Calcutta, Bengal.
- Muhammad Haneef, Duffadar of peons, Salem Collectorate, Madras.
- Govind Santram Jadhav, Naik of peons, Office of the Executive Engineer, Public Works Department, Belgaum Division, Bombay.
- Bolar Yakub Khan, Duffadar of peons, District Court, South Kanara, Madras.
- Khadim Khan, Jemadar of peons in the Office of the Private Secretary to His Excellency the Viceroy.
- Palavesa Perumal Kone, Duffadar of peons, District Court, Tinnevelly, Madras.
- Pandit Ganga Ram, Duftry, Foreign and Political Department, Government of India.
- Lala Devi Sahai, Record Sorter, Foreign and Political Department, Government of India.
- Nand Kishor Singh, Warden of the Hazaribagh Reformatory School, Bihar and Orissa.
- Mohammed Sulayman, Head Duftry in the Office of the Private Secretary to His Excellency the Viceroy.

=== Order of the Companions of Honour (CH) ===
- Robert Laurence Binyon, LLD. Poet. Deputy Keeper, Sub-Department of Oriental Prints and Drawings, British Museum.
- Edward Verrall Lucas, LLD. Author, Journalist and Publisher.

=== Kaisar-i-Hind Medal ===
For Public Services in India.

- Mary O'Brien Beadon, MB, BS, LSA, Principal, Lady Hardinge Medical College, Delhi.
- Helen Marion Franklin, MB, BS, Medical Superintendent, Lady Reading Hospital, Simla.
- Julia Henrietta, Lady Jackson (wife of the Right Honourable Sir Stanley Jackson, lately Governor of Bengal).
- Agnes Ferguson McKenzie (wife of the Reverend John McKenzie, Principal, Wilson College, Bombay).
- Jessie Agnes McReddie, Chief Inspectress of Girls Schools, United Provinces.
- The Reverend George Carstairs, BD, Missionary, Church of Scotland, Ajmer-Merwara, Rajputana.
- Albert Hailey Henderson, MD, Medical Missionary, American Baptist Mission, Taunggyi, Burma.
- The Reverend Edwin Herbert Lewis, Secretary, London Missionary Society, Bellary, Madras.
- Charles Edward Vail, MD, FACS, Surgeon and Physician, American Presbyterian Mission Hospital, Miraj, Bombay.

==== Bar to the Kaisar-i-Hind Medal ====
- Rai Bahadur Lala Mathra Dass, Honorary Assistant Surgeon to His Excellency the Viceroy.
- Ernest Muir, Mission for Lepers and Research Worker in Leprosy, School of Tropical Medicine, Calcutta, Bengal.

=== Royal Red Cross (RRC) ===
==== Associate of the Royal Red Cross (ARRC) ====
- Nursing Sister Annie Fryer, Queen Alexandra's Royal Naval Nursing Service.

=== Air Force Cross (AFC) ===
Royal Air Force

- Flight Lieutenant Charles Edmund Maitland, DFC.
- Flying Officer John Bernard Walter Pugh.

Royal Navy

- Lieutenant-Commander Rupert St. Aubyn Malleson, (Flight Lieutenant, Royal Air Force).

=== Air Force Medal (AFM) ===
- 22679 Flight Sergeant (Pilot) Edward Fitzgerald Godfray.

=== King's Police Medal (KPM) ===
India

- Richard Gordon Bathgate Prescott, District Superintendent, Burma Police.
- Guy Joseph Harvey, District Superintendent, Burma Police.
- George Chettle, District Superintendent, Burma Police.

Colonies, Protectorates, &c.

- Ahmed Faiz, Inspector, Cyprus Military Police, Nicosia Division.
- Sofoklis Ioannis Kaminarides, Private, Cyprus Military Police, Paphos Division.

== Promotions and appointments ==
Rear-Admiral

- Captain His Royal Highness, Albert Frederick Arthur George, Duke of York, KG, KT, GCMG, GCVO. (From 3 June 1932).

Major-General

- His Royal Highness, Albert Frederick Arthur George, Duke of York, Earl of Inverness, KG, KT, GCMG, GCVO, Colonel-in-Chief 11th Hussars (Prince Albert's Own), The Somerset Light Infantry (Prince Albert's), The East Yorkshire Regiment, Royal Army Ordnance Corps, and The Leicestershire Yeomanry (Prince Albert's Own) (Hussars), Personal Aide-de-Camp to The King.

Air Vice Marshal

- Group Captain His Royal Highness Albert Frederick Arthur George, Duke of York, KG, KT, GCMG, GCVO, Personal Aide-de-Camp to the King.

Honorary Air Commodore-in-Chief of the Auxiliary Air Force

- Air Marshal His Royal Highness the Prince of Wales, KG, KT, KP, GCSI, GCMG, GCIE, GCVO, GBE, MC, Personal Aide-de-Camp to the King.

Honorary Air Commodore

- The Rt. Hon. Sir Samuel John Gurney Hoare, Bt, GBE, CMG, DL, JP, MP, of No. 604 (County of Middlesex) (Bomber) Squadron. (Dated 3 June 1932).
- The Rt. Hon. Sir Philip Albert Gustave David Sassoon, Bt, GBE, CMG, MP, of No. 601 (County of London) (Bomber) Squadron. (Dated 3 June 1932).
