= Lloyd Barrage Museum =

Museum in Sindh, Pakistan

- موزه لائیڈ بیراج
- Location: Arore Nara Canal Road 34, RCW Rohri, Sukkur, Sindh, Pakistan
- Coordinates: 27°40′24″N 68°50′50″E
- Type: Engineering museum History museum
- Collections: Scale models, construction materials, historic photographs and machinery from the construction of the Sukkur Barrage
- Public transit access: Sukkur railway station

The Lloyd Barrage Museum (Urdu: موزه لائیڈ بیراج) is a museum situated on Lloyd Barrage in Sukkur, Sindh. It provides information related to the construction of the Lloyd Barrage.

== Collections ==
The museum features several scale models, with the Lloyd Barrage's large, spotlighted model being the centerpiece.

Other exhibits include construction materials such as crush stone, portland cement, gravel, and models of architectural elements such as arches, floodgates, piers, and stones. The exhibit is supplemented with photographs of personalities such as George Ambrose Lloyd and Arnold Musto, who played a role in the barrage's construction, and a photo gallery that provides a guided overview of the Sukkur Barrage's construction process.

In addition to indoor exhibits, the museum also displays outdoor exhibits of the machinery involved in the Lloyd Barrage's construction. These exhibits include a heavy-duty crane, a boat, a road roller, and a lathe machine for cutting and shaping nuts and bolts.
