= Cecil Kisch =

British civil servant in the India Office

Sir Cecil Hermann Kisch
- Born: 31 March 1884; Kolkata
- Died: 20 October 1961 (aged 77); London
- Occupations: civil servant and administrator

Sir Cecil Hermann Kisch, KCIE, CB (31 March 1884 – 20 October 1961) was a British civil servant in the India Office who rose to be Deputy Under-Secretary of State for India from 1943 to 1946. In later life, he became an author and historian, and had a long literary career.

== Early life and family ==
He belonged to the Jewish Kisch family of Prague. He was born on 31 March 1884 in Kolkata, India. He was the son of Herman Michael Kisch and Alice Charlotte Kisch.

His father Michael Kisch joined the Imperial Civil Service in 1873 and later became the deputy secretary to government of India, postmaster-general of Bengal as well as director-general of the post office in India.

His brother Frederick Hermann Kisch became a British delegate to the Versailles peace conference after having fought in First World War.

Cecil Kisch has been married twice, once to Myra Hannah Kisch and the other time to Rebecca Grace Kisch.

He died on 20 October, 1961 in London, England.

== Career ==
He joined the General Post Office in 1907, then was appointed to the India Office in 1908. In 1917, he became a private secretary to Edwin Montagu, the then Secretary of State for India.

In 1921, he was appointed as the finance department of the India Office and was the key driver behind numerous monetary reforms including the establishment of the Reserve Bank of India.

He has represented India at the international monetary conference at Geneva in 1933 and later served on the supervisory finance committee of the League of Nations.

== Works ==
He contributed to works on colonial India and its monetary policies:

- Central Banks; a Study of the Constitutions of Banks of Issue, with an Analysis of Representative Charters (co-authored with W. A. Elkin, 1928)
- The Portuguese Bank Note Case; the Story and Solution of a Financial Perplexity (1932)
- The Principles and Problems of Federal Finance by B. P. Adarkar (foreword by C. H. Kisch, 1933)

He translated a number of works from the Russian language to the English language:

- The Waggon of Life, and Other Lyrics by Russian Poets of the Nineteenth Century (with foreword by C. M. Bowra, 1947)
- Alexander Blok: Prophet of Revolution (1960) a study of his life and work, illustrated by translations from his poems and other writings

== Awards and honours ==
At the 1919 New Year Honours, he was made a Companion of the Order of the Bath.

He received his knighthood at the 1932 Birthday Honours and was awarded the Order of the Indian Empire.
