= Thomas Martland Ainscough =

British trade commissioner (1886-1976)

Sir Thomas Martland Ainscough OBE, CBE
- Born: 12 August 1886
- Died: 15 October 1976 (aged 90); Dorset
- Education: Manchester University
- Occupation: Senior trade commissioner
- Children: 2 sons

Sir Thomas Martland Ainscough OBE CBE (12 August 1886 – 15 October 1976) was a British Senior Trade Commissioner in India, Burma and Ceylon from 1918 to 1944.

== Early life and education ==
Ainscough was born on 12 August 1886, the eldest son of James Ainscough of Parbold, Lancashire. He was educated at Manchester Grammar School, in Switzerland, and at Manchester University.

== Career ==
Ainscough began his career in business working for an export firm in Manchester. In 1906, he went to China to represent the firm, and continued to travel extensively in western China while returning from time to time to report to his firm. In 1912, he left the business to take up the appointment of Special Commissioner to the Board of Trade in China, on the recommendation of the Advisory Committee on Commercial Intelligence, to inquire into the conditions and prospects of British trade in China. From 1916–17, he served as Secretary to the Board of Trade of the Textile Committee, and the Empire Cotton Weaving Committee.

In 1918, Ainscough was appointed Senior British Trade Commissioner in India, Burma and Ceylon (later India and Ceylon), and played a key role in matters affecting the British Empire and Great Britain, remaining in the post for more than 25 years until his retirement in 1944. He reported on business conditions in India, Burma and Ceylon, and his bi-annual reports attracted significant interest in the press and in business circles in Britain, providing information and assistance on changing circumstances, while also developing closer business ties between Britain and India, Burma and Ceylon.

In 1920, Ainscough was briefly attached to the Persian Tariff Commission, and in 1932, was a member of the British delegation at the Imperial Economic Conference in Ottawa, Canada when preferential tariffs were negotiated. In 1942, he was appointed British Representative of the Ministry of War Transport, and organised the war department at Delhi. He retired from public service in 1944.

== Personal life and death ==
Ainscough married Mabel Lincolne in 1918 and they had two sons, one of whom was killed in action in 1941. In 1956, after the death of his first wife, he married Marjorie Jones and remained married to her until his death, Lady Marjorie died in 1981, Lady Ainscough's grandson Simon Martin resides quietly on the Isle of Wight with his partner JJ Martin HBSK

Ainscough died on 15 October 1976 in Dorset, aged 90.

== Honours ==
Ainscough was appointed Officer of the Order of the British Empire (OBE) in the 1918 Birthday Honours. He was promoted to Commander of the Order of the British Empire (CBE) in the 1925 Birthday Honours. He was created a Knight Bachelor in the 1932 Birthday Honours.
