= John William Oldfield =

Sri Lankan politician (1886–1955)

Hon. Maj. John William Oldfield CMG, CBE, MC, ED

Member of the Ceylon Parliament for Community (appointed member)
- In office 1947–1952
- Preceded by: seat created

Personal details
- Born: 22 October 1886 Georgetown, British Guiana
- Died: 1 December 1955 (aged 69) Colombo, Ceylon
- Spouse(s): Jenny Gillespie née Harper (m.1910), Margaret Ella Dakeyne (m.1954)
- Education: St. Anne's, Redhill

Major John William Oldfield CMG OBE MC ED (22 October 1886 – 1 December 1955), was a prominent figure in the commercial and public life in Ceylon, serving as the chairman of the Ceylon Planters' Association between 1924 and 1925, an appointed member of the State Council of Ceylon in 1931 and as an appointed member of the first Parliament of Ceylon in 1947.

John William Oldfield was born at Georgetown, British Guiana, on 22 October 1886, and was educated at St. Anne's School, Redhill, Surrey. At the age of 21 he went to Ceylon and worked on several tea plantations for the next seven years. During that time he served as an officer in the Ceylon Planters' Rifle Corps. Following the outbreak of World War I in 1914 he was granted a commission in the Cameronians and by 1915 had become Brigade Machine Gun officer. From 1917 to 1919 he served on the Divisional and Corps staff as Deputy Assistant Adjutant General. His services were mentioned five times in dispatches and he was awarded the Military Cross in 1916 and appointed an OBE in 1919. Oldfield also received the Croix de Guerre and was made a Chevalier of the Order of Leopold.

Following the end of the war Oldfield returned to Ceylon, where he was selected as the chairman of the Ceylon Planters' Association in 1924. In 1926 he served as the European unofficial member of the Executive Council of Ceylon. In 1931 he was appointed as the European member of the State Council of Ceylon. In 1932 he received the Companion of the Order of St Michael and St George in the King's Birthday Honours for his public service in Ceylon.

In November 1947, Oldfield was appointed as a member of the Ceylon House of Representatives. He was one of six members appointed by the Governor-General, to represent important interests which were not represented or inadequately represented in the House.

Oldfield was married twice, firstly in 1910 to Jenny Gillespie, daughter of F. Vogan Harper. They had three daughters and a son. In 1954 he married Margaret Ella Dakeyne.

Oldfield died in Colombo in December 1955.
