= Harold Brown (Royal Navy officer) =

British naval engineer (1878–1968)

Brown in 1932

Engineer Vice-Admiral Sir Harold Arthur Brown GBE KCB (19 March 1878 – 15 February 1968) was an English engineer who served with the Royal Navy.

== History ==
Brown was born in Southery, Norfolk, the son of farmer Joseph John Brown of Esher, Surrey and Caroline Martha Brown.

The grave of Sir Harold Brown in Brookwood Cemetery in 2018

Brown joined the Royal Navy in 1894 as a trainee engineer at the Devonport Dockyards. In 1899, he qualified as a Probationary Assistant Engineer, promoted to engineer lieutenant in 1900. In 1912, he was promoted to engineer lieutenant-commander, engineer commander in 1917 and engineer captain in 1924. He served in Washington as Assistant Naval Attache 1921–1925. In 1930 he was appointed engineer rear-admiral and in 1932 was appointed vice-admiral and Engineer-in-Chief of the Fleet. He served as Director-General of Munitions Production, The War Office and retired in 1936.

In 1910, he married Marion Lillie Macbean, daughter of Col. Forbes Macbean (1857–1919). They are buried together in Brookwood Cemetery in Surrey.

== Recognition ==
Brown was appointed:

- CB in the 1932 Birthday Honours list
- KCB in the 1934 Birthday Honours list
- GBE in the 1939 Birthday Honours list
