= Charlton Harrison =

British civil engineer (1881–1951)

- Born: 18 May 1881; Jamaica, British West Indies
- Died: 3 July 1951 (aged 70); Goring-on-Thames, Oxfordshire, England, UK
- Occupation: Civil engineer
- Notable work: Sukkur Barrage (1932)

Sir Charlton Scott Cholmeley Harrison, KCIE (18 May 1881 – 3 July 1951), was a British civil engineer who spent his career from 1902 until 1933 in British India. He was the chief engineer in overall charge of the construction of the Sukkur Barrage, completed in 1931. Arnold Musto was the designer of this barrage.

== Early life and family ==
Charlton Harrison was born in Jamaica, British West Indies, 18 May 1881, the second of three sons of the Hon. James Harrison, JP, custos rotulorum of St Thomas in the East, Jamaica, and his second wife, Caroline, née Page, in her third marriage. He was married to Violet Muriel Monamy Buckell, second daughter of Dr E. H. Buckell, JP, Chichester, England, on 25 November 1905 in the Cathedral of St. Thomas, Bombay, India. They had three sons.

== Career in British India ==
After training in the Royal Indian Engineering College at Cooper's Hill, Surrey, England, from 1899 to 1902, Harrison entered the Indian Service of Engineers as assistant engineer, Bombay Presidency, and served in Belgaum, 1902–06; assistant on construction of irrigation works, Nasik district, 1906–09; executive engineer Nasik district, 1909–10; executive engineer irrigation canals construction, Nasik and Ahmadnagar district, 1911–1919; arbitrator in irrigation dispute between Jamnagar and Porbandar states, 1916; superintending engineer, special duty, Sind, 1921–23; chief engineer, Sukkur Barrage, 1923–31; chief engineer, Public Works Department, Bombay Presidency, and chief engineer in Sind, 1931–33. He was knighted in 1932.

Harrison's major life's work consisted in overseeing the immense project known as the Sukkur (Lloyd) Barrage, as chief engineer, from 1923 until its completion in 1931. It was brought in on schedule and within its target budget.

== The Sukkur Barrage and canals construction in Sindh, British India ==
The initial conception of a barrage across the river Indus at Sukkur, now in Pakistan, is credited to Lt. Colonel Walter Scott, superintendent of the Canal and Forest Department in 1846. Later schemes, by Lieutenant (later General) J.G Fife in 1855, and by Dr T. Summers in 1906 and 1910, followed. However, a complete scheme was not produced until the project designed by Arnold Musto, a British national serving as an executive engineer with the Indian Service of Engineers. His plans were submitted to the Government of Bombay, and in April 1923 the Secretary of State for India sanctioned the project at an estimated cost of Rs 200 million. Charlton Harrison was appointed chief engineer, effectively chief executive, of the project, in recognition of his prior executive experience and demonstrated leadership and management skills. Work started in January 1925 and was completed by 31 December 1931. A unanimous resolution of the District Local Board was passed that the barrage be named after Sir George Lloyd, later Lord Lloyd, the Governor of Bombay in 1923, who had taken an active interest in the scheme.

This was the world's largest civil engineering project during the first 50 years of the 20th century. It is still the largest irrigation system in the world. The barrage enables water to flow through what was originally a network of canals 6,166 miles (9,923 km) long, with more than 5 million acres (20,000 km^{2}) of irrigated land. The retaining wall has 66 spans, each 60 feet (18 m) wide. Each span has a gate weighing 50 tons.

Reports on the extent of this project tend to vary. One report states that "It is the backbone of the economy of the entire country (of Pakistan), providing, through its network of canals, irrigation to an area of 7.63 million acres, approximately 25 per cent of the total canal-irrigated area." Another report states: "The 5,001 feet (1,524 m) long barrage is made of yellow stone and steel and can water nearly 10 million acres (40,000 km^{2}) of farmland through its seven large canals. Some of the canals are larger than the Suez Canal."

A contemporary U.S. report in 1932 stated that "Besides two dams which are, respectively, the largest and the second highest in the world, the project includes a network of canals and spillways 6,000 miles long. On it 77,000 men were employed for nine years. It cost $75,000,000 and will irrigate a rainless desert area as big as Massachusetts, Rhode Island and Delaware together. Statisticians figured that the masonry in the Lloyd dam would build a wall six feet high, 15 inches thick and 520 miles long. It should provide farm work for an additional 2,500,000 people." However, the rest of this report of the inaugural ceremony, which first appeared in Time magazine, is mistaken in its details concerning the personalities involved.

The report appeared on 25 January 1932, and was then re-printed, virtually verbatim, in the San Antonio Express, San Antonio, Texas, on Sunday, 28 February 1932; and in The Nashua Reporter, Nashua, Iowa, on Wednesday, 28 September 1932. It stated: "Immediately after the ceremony Lord Willingdon announced that a knighthood had been awarded to the British designer of the project: Charlton Scott Cholmeley Harrison. Undoubtedly the Lloyd Barrage will do more for the people of northwestern India than anything St. Gandhi has been able to think of, but all its waters could not quench Nationalist pride. India seethed with the news that Arnold Musto, native engineer in charge of construction who spent seven hot summers by the dam site, designed much special machinery, was not rewarded at all." This assertion is a remarkable travesty of the truth.

The facts are that Arnold Musto, who was also knighted, was not a "native engineer" in any sense. Musto is an Italian and English surname; and he was the son of J. J. Musto of London. Arnold Musto was born in 1883, and married Margaret McCausland of Magherafelt, County Londonderry, Northern Ireland, in 1922. After training in England he entered the Public Works Department in Bombay in 1907 as an assistant engineer. He then served in Mesopotamia, 1916–18, and as controller of munitions in Karachi January–May 1918. The Future of Sind: Sukkur Barrage Scheme, by Arnold Musto, was published by Times Press in 1923. Musto, not Harrison, was the "designer" of the project; whereas Harrison was in overall administrative charge, and had also "spent seven hot summers by the dam site".

In The Unsung (1945), Maud Diver wrote of their joint achievement as follows: "In Mr Arnold Musto the Bombay PWD produced a man in every way fitted for so mighty a task. To him was given the double privilege of designing and building that mile-long dam, under the direction of Sir Charlton Harrison, chief engineer of the whole project. Both men were deservedly knighted for their twofold achievement; and Harrison, in particular, was blest by his assistants for his care and thought in protecting them, as far as might be, from the terrible climate of Sukkur, where the mercury often touched 120 degrees for months on end. Harrison had the wisdom and humanity to insist on proper housing of his engineers, the common comforts of electric fans and light before he would ask them to begin work; and they, in return, gave of their utmost without flagging ... and in record time they completed their seven canals."

== Later life and death ==
Harrison retired from the Indian Civil Service in 1933, and by 1935 had settled near his birthplace in Jamaica, a country in which he had spent his childhood and for which he had a deep affection. Before that, in England, he had been called to give expert evidence to the Simon Commission, part of the process which eventually resulted in the Government of India Act 1935.

In 1935, Harrison was a member of the seven man Island Committee of Independent Jamaicans. This group was formed to investigate the critical situation regarding banana production and export, leading to the appointment of the Jamaica Banana Commission of 1936. The result was the conversion of the Jamaica Banana Producers Association Limited (JBPA) into a joint stock company with shares issued to members to the value of the contributions they had made to the Co-operative. Through the work of the JBPA by the following year banana exports reached an all-time high of 360,000 tons, representing more than 50% of the value of the island's exports.

The obituary article reporting Harrison's death in The Daily Gleaner, also notes that after returning to Jamaica in December 1933, he was actively engaged in several other aspects of Jamaican life. These included serving as a member of the Diocesan Council, and of the Lay Body of the Church of England and Diocesan Financial Board. As well as membership of the Island Committee of Independent Jamaicans, he was Chairman of the Cost of Foodstuffs Production Committee; a member of the Board of Management of the Jamaica Agricultural Society; a member of the Jamaica Citrus Growers Association; Chairman of the Jamaica Imperial Association, and a JP for St Thomas in the East.

In Towards Decolonisation, a book by Richard Hart, published in 1999, Sir Charlton Harrison is incidentally described (p. 153) as being, in 1942, a "white plantation owner", which is misleading, as the role he played in Jamaican affairs derived from his managerial experience and distinction as a civil engineer in British India, in which "plantation ownership" played no part. Although Harrison is occasionally designated "planter" in some post-1933 Jamaican publications, there is no known record of Sir Charlton Harrison owning a plantation. Hart's book discusses the relationships, rivalry and conflicts between popular Jamaican political organizations in the 1940s.

After World War II, in about 1947, at the request of his wife, Harrison moved to live in Streatley, Berkshire, England; and died in a nursing home at Goring-on-Thames, 3 July 1951, having suffered a stroke approximately six months previously. His wife Violet died in 1973.

== See also ==
- Sukkur Barrage and canals, Pakistan. Formerly Sind, British India.

== Sources ==
- The London Gazette, 12 April 1932, p. 2398.
- Supplement to the London Gazette, 3 June 1932, pp. 3568–3569.
- The Daily Gazette, Karachi, 16 February 1933. Public Farewell to Sir Charlton Harrison.
- The Times, London, 13 November 1934
- Hansard: 11 December 1934, 4 April 1935, 3 May 1935
- The Daily Gleaner, Jamaica, 18 November 1940.
- The Times, Obituary, Sir Charlton Harrison, 4 July 1951
- The Times, Obituary, Sir Arnold Musto, 31 May 1977
- Who Was Who: 1951-1960. Entry for Sir Charlton Harrison.
- Who's Who: 1977. Entry for Sir Arnold Musto.
