= Noel Curtis-Bennett =

British civil servant and sports administrator

Sir Francis Noel Curtis-Bennett, KCVO (14 May 1882 – 2 December 1950) was a British civil servant and sports administrator. In the Civil Service, he reached the rank of Assistant Secretary in HM Treasury, whilst in sports he was involved with numerous organizations, and was a member of the International Olympic Committee and of the International Playing Fields Committee.

He was the son of Sir Henry Curtis-Bennett, Chief Metropolitan Magistrate, and the younger brother of Sir Henry Honywood Curtis-Bennett, KC.

He was appointed an Inspector for the Small Holdings and Allotments Act 1908 by the Board of Agriculture and Fisheries in 1909, and an Inspector for the National Health Insurance Commission in 1912.

He was appointed a Commander of the Royal Victorian Order (CVO) in the 1926 Birthday Honours, and promoted to Knight Commander of the Order (KCVO) in the 1932 Birthday Honours.
