= William Pinker =

William Albert Pinker OBE
- Born: 9 May 1847; Box, Wiltshire, England
- Died: 3 June 1932 (aged 85); London
- Occupations: Stonemason, museum technician
- Spouse: Jane Harris
- Children: Jennifer Pinker; Rose Pinker; Florence Pinker

William Albert Pinker OBE (9 May 1847 – 5 June 1932) was an English stonemason and museum technician at the British Museum, serving in the Department of Antiquities from 1873 and as foreman of masons from 1894.

== Biography ==
Pinker was born on 9 May 1847, in the village of Box, Wiltshire, the fifth of nine children born to James Pinker (1810–1878) and Mary Chandler (1814–1882). He came from a long line of stonemasons and quarrymen, including his father, who worked in the Box Quarries mining Bath stone. From the age of around 6, Pinker joined his father and older brothers in the quarries, working as a "labourer". In the mid-1860s Pinker left Box and travelled to London, where he found employment as a mason in Kensington. Shortly afterwards, he met Jane Harris. They married on 31 December 1876 in Southwark. They would go on to have three daughters: Jennifer "Jenny" (1878–1970), Florence (1881–1929) and Rose (1884–1976).

Pinker became employed at the British Museum on 18 November 1872, and would go on to work there for just under 60 years. From 1 January 1873 he worked for the Department of Antiquities, and was foreman of masons from 1894. He undertook many highly skilled tasks, not only for the Department of Antiquities but also for other areas of the British Museum. He played a significant role in situating fragments of the Elgin Marbles, and also advised during the construction of the model of the Mausoleum of Halicarnassus. Alexander Stuart Murray commented that Pinker's work was "more appropriate to a sculptor's assistant than to a mason."

He retired on 5 April 1932, due to failing health. Two days before his death, he was granted an OBE in the 1932 Birthday Honours by King George V. Pinker died on 3 June 1932, at the age of 85. His life was the subject of an obituary in The Times.
