= Lodhi Karim Hyder =

Indian economist

Lodhi Karim Hyder, CIE
- Born: 17 July 1890
- Died: 27 May 1953 (aged 62)
- Spouse: Stephanie Wolfsohn
- Children: Agnes Dorothy Fatima Hyder
- Father: Nadir Ali

Lodhi Karim Hyder, CIE (17 July 1890 – 27 May 1953), also known as L. K. Hyder, was an Indian economist, politician and the founding head of the Economics Department of Aligarh Muslim University (AMU). He also worked as joint secretary to the government of India in the Finance Department and as member of the Union Public Service Commission from 2 February 1932 to 31 December 1936.

However, his most notable work came as a member of the Royal Commission on Agriculture in India from 1926 to 1928. In 1924 he was elected MLA from Agra Division (Rural). He was nominated as Indian representative for agriculture at the International Economic Conference in Geneva held in May 1927. He was member of the Indian Central Banking Inquiry Committee 1931 (Chairman Sir Bhupendra Nath Mitra). He was member Indian Taxation Enquiry Committee 1926.

For his service, he was awarded Companion of the Order of Indian Empire (CIE) on 3 June 1932 (1932 Birthday Honours). This award was invested by the viceroy on 2 March 1934 in New Delhi at the Viceroy's House. Hyder was invited by League of Nations General Assembly as delegate representative from India during the Twelfth Ordinary Session of the Assembly.

In 1909, he was elected vice president of AMU Student Union. Later, he moved to the UK to complete his AB from King's College in 1912 and PhD from Heidelberg. He was elected president of the Indian Economic Association in 1944 in its Delhi session. After he retired from Aligarh Muslim University in 1947, he settled along with his German wife in his native place village matore Kahuta, Rawalpindi (Pakistan). After a couple of years, he was appointed first deputy high commissioner of Pakistan to England. He died in 1953 in London .

He published extensively in various economic journals.

== Articles ==
- L. K. Hyder, The means of transport in India and their influence on economic life, 1921, Yearbook d. Philos. Faculty Heidelberg 1921/22, T. 2. S. 160 - 162
- L. K. Hyder, Grundriss der Sozialokonomik: Zweite Abteilung: Erster Teil., The Economic Journal, Volume 35, Issue 137, 1 March 1925, Pages 118–122.
- L. K. Hyder, Dr. Radhakamal Mukerjee, Principles of Comparative Economics., The Economic Journal, Volume 33, Issue 132, 1 December 1923, Pages 550–551.
- L. K. Hyder, Ludwtg Mises and Franz Klein. Die geldtheorelische und geldrechtliche Seite des Stabilisierungsproblem., The Economic Journal, Volume 35, Issue 137, 1 March 1925, Pages 116–118.
- L. K. Hyder, Hermann Levy. Die Grundlagen des okonomischen Liberalismus in der Geschichte der englischen Volkswirtschaft, The Economic Journal, Volume 23, Issue 91, 1 September 1913, Pages 413–414
- L. K. Hyder, The Agrarian System of Moslem India. by W. H. Moreland, The Economic Journal, Volume 41, Issue 162, 1 June 1931, Pages 276–283.
- L. K. Hyder, Ltdwig Stein. Die Soziale Frage., The Economic Journal, Volume 35, Issue 137, 1 March 1925, Pages 128–129.
- L. K. Hyder, Victor Hoemann. Die Devalvierung des österreicldschen Papier geld im Jahre 1811 : Fine finanzgeschichtliche Darstellung nach archivalischen Quellen., The Economic Journal, Volume 35, Issue 137, 1 March 1925, Pages 113–116
