= Ernest Salter Davies =

British teacher (1872–1955)

Ernest Salter Davies CBE (25 October 1872 – 10 June 1955) was a Welsh teacher and educationalist, who served as director of education for Kent from 1918 to 1938. His influence extended beyond Kent, as he was chairman of the Carnegie United Kingdom Trust, editor of the Journal of Education and President or chairman of trustees of several other institutions.

== Life ==
Salter Davies was born on 25 October 1872 to Thomas Davies, a Baptist clergyman from Haverfordwest, who had married Emma Rebecca Davies (born Hailsham, Sussex), at Haverfordwest, in 1859. Salter was the youngest of four known children and educated at the grammar school there before studying at the University College of Wales, Aberystwyth. He then won a scholarship in classics to Jesus College, Oxford. In 1895, he started work as a teacher, initially at Glasgow Academy before moving to Cheltenham Grammar School in 1897. He was appointed inspector for higher education in Kent in 1904, becoming the county's Director of Education in 1918. He was education adviser to Maidstone Prison between 1923 and 1928. He also held office as President of the Association of Directors and Secretaries for Education (1924), President of the New Education Fellowship (English section) (1932–33) and president of the Library Association (1935). He also served as chairman of trustees of the National Central Library and chairman of the Rural Schools Committee on the Central Council for School Broadcasting. He was appointed a Commander of the Order of the British Empire (CBE) in 1932. He retired from his post of Director of Education in 1938, and was then editor of the Journal of Education from 1939 to the spring of 1955. He was also chairman of the Carnegie United Kingdom Trust, having been appointed when he was in his seventies and stepping down in 1951. His obituary in The Times described him as "for long a leading figure in educational administration and thought in England". His own publications included several books on educational themes, including The Aim of Education and Education for Industry and Life. He died at his home in Croydon on 10 June 1955.
