= Arnold Musto =

British civil engineer

Arnold Albert Musto (4 October 1883 – 29 May 1977) was a British civil engineer who designed the Sukkur Barrage, now in Sindh Province, Pakistan.

== Early life and family ==
Sir Arnold Musto was born in Stepney, London, the son of James Joseph Musto (1844–1908) an Alderman on the Stepney Borough Council, and a member of an extended family of engineers operating in the East End of London in the second half of the 19th century.

He was educated at the Coopers’ Company's School, London, 1894–1899 and Birkbeck College, University of London, 1900–1904.

In 1922, at St Thomas’ Cathedral, Bombay, he married Margaret McCausland. They had a son and four daughters. Margaret died in 1965.

== Engineering career ==
Musto's first engineering experience, while articled to James Brown, was constructing the Rotherhithe Tunnel, in 1905–1906. Soon after, he qualified for the Indian Public Works Department (later called the Indian Service of Engineers) and was appointed mechanical and agricultural engineer to the Bombay Government. He commenced as an assistant engineer in October 1907 and became an executive engineer in October 1915.

He joined the Indian Army Reserve of Officers and served in Mesopotamia in the latter half of World War I.

In 1918, he became Executive Engineer for the Sukkur Barrage Project District and, in this capacity, designed and submitted the complete project for the Barrage and its associated canals.

He became a Member of the Institution of Civil Engineers in 1922 and, in 1923, he was made a Companion of the Order of the Indian Empire (CIE). He became a nominated member of the Bombay Legislative Council in 1923.

In 1923 he also became the Superintending Engineer for the construction of the Sukkur Barrage and the headworks of the seven canal systems. The Barrage was completed under the overall direction of Sir Charlton Harrison as Chief Engineer of Sindh, and opened in 1932.

He received a knighthood in recognition of his work in the King's Birthday Honours 1932.

== Later life ==
Musto retired from India in 1934 and took up residence in Long Bar Hall to the South of Bishop's Stortford, on the Essex Hertfordshire Border, where he made extensive changes. Interviews with his daughter in 2007 revealed during a re-visit to Long Bar Hall, revealed he forthright personality and even it is alleged had the influence to phone the Station Master at Sawbridgeworth Station to hold the express train to London.

In 1939, he was chair of a Planning and Housing Commission sent to Trinidad. He returned to England, in 1940, and was appointed Regional Transport Commissioner for the Midland Region. In 1946 he was appointed Regional Transport Commissioner for the South Western Region. He retired in 1953, at the age of 70.

His obituary in The Times said he was “a likeable man and got on well with those about him” both in India and as a Regional Transport Commissioner in England.
