= Mowat baronets =

Extinct baronetcy in the Baronetage of the United Kingdom

There have been two baronetcies created for persons with the surname Mowat, one in the Baronetage of Nova Scotia and one in the Baronetage of the United Kingdom.

The Mowat Baronetcy, of Inglestoun, was created in the Baronetage of Nova Scotia on 2 June 1664 for George Mowat. Nothing further is known about this title after the death of the fourth Baronet some time after 1690.

The Mowat Baronetcy, of Cleckheaton in the County of York, was created in the Baronetage of the United Kingdom on 25 June 1932 for John Mowat. The title became extinct on the death of the second Baronet in 1968.

== Mowat baronets, of Ingelstoun (1664) ==
- Sir George Mowat, 1st Baronet (died 1666)
- Sir Roger Mowat, 2nd Baronet (died 1683)
- Sir William Mowat, 3rd Baronet (died c. 1690)
- Sir Alexander Mowat, 4th Baronet

== Mowat baronets, of Cleckheaton (1932) ==
- Sir John Gunn Mowat, 1st Baronet (1859–1935)
- Sir Alfred Law Mowat, 2nd Baronet (1890–1968)
