= Arnold Savage Bailey =

British lawyer and colonial administrator

Arnold Savage Bailey CBE
- Born: 1881
- Died: 1 April 1935 (aged 53–54)
- Occupations: Lawyer and colonial administrator
- Years active: 1907-1935
- Spouse: Kate Edith Clulow Gray (m. 1910)
- Children: 2 daughters and 1 son

Arnold Savage Bailey CBE (1881 – 1 April 1935) was a British lawyer and colonial administrator who spent his career in Malaya.

== Early life and education ==
Arnold Savage Bailey was born in 1881, the youngest son of Alfred Bailey, barrister-at-law, and the grandson of Edward Savage Bailey who was President of the Law Society. He was educated at St Paul's School, and admitted as a solicitor in 1905.

== Career ==
In 1907, Bailey went to Singapore and practised at the local bar until 1913. He then went to Kuala Lumpur and founded the firm Bannon and Bailey with Raymond Bannon, and later became a partner in the firm Hogan and Ivens in Penang. In 1925 he was a founder member of the Selangor Bar Association. At various times he was appointed an unofficial member of the Federal Council of the Federated Malay States during the 1920s. In 1933, he was appointed to the Supreme Court Bench and sat in the Johore Supreme Court, before he joined the Department of Statistics.

== Personal life and death ==
Bailey married Kate Edith Clulow Gray on 21 June 1910, and they had two daughters and a son. He was a keen sportsman who represented Singapore and Selangor at cricket, and Singapore at rugby, and was President of the Kuala Lumpur Rotary Club.

Bailey died on 1 April 1935 from injuries received when he fell from a ship at Tanjong Pagar Wharves, Singapore.

== Honours ==
Bailey was appointed a Commander of the Order of the British Empire in 1932.
