= Sukkur Barrage =

Indus River barrage in Sindh, Pakistan

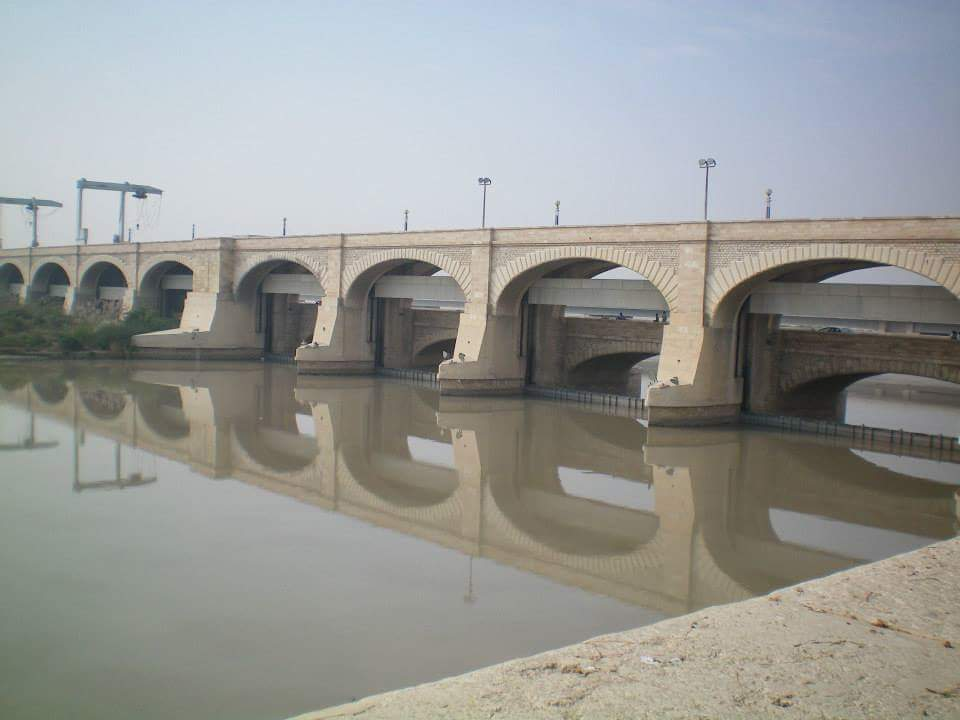
- Sukkur Barrage Photo from Upstream side
- Interactive map of Sukkur Barrage
- Official name: سکر بئراج سکھر بیراج
- Country: Pakistan
- Location: Sindh
- Coordinates: 27°40′50″N 68°50′43″E
- Opening date: 1932
- Operators: Sindh Irrigation & Power Department

Dam and spillways
- Impounds: Indus River
- Length: Approximately 2 km (1 mi)
- Spillway capacity: 1.15 million cusec

Sukkur Barrage (Sindhi: سکر بئراج, Urdu: سکھر بیراج) is a barrage on the River Indus near the city of Sukkur in the Sindh province of Pakistan. The barrage was built during the British Raj from 1923 to 1932 and was named Lloyd Barrage. It is considered to be the largest single irrigation network of its kind in the world. It irrigates from Sukkur district in the north, to Mirpurkhas/Tharparkar and Hyderabad districts in the south of Sindh, almost all parts of the province. It is situated about 500 kilometres (300 miles) northeast of Karachi, 5 kilometres (3 miles) below the railway bridge, or the Sukkur Gorge. The introduction of barrage-controlled irrigation system resulted in more timely water supplies for the existing cultivated areas of Sindh province of Pakistan.

== History ==
Sindh survives almost entirely on the water of the River Indus as there is very limited groundwater available. Rainfall in the province averages between 100 and 200 millimetres (3.9 and 7.9 in) per year, while the evaporation rate is between 1,000 and 2,000 millimetres (39 and 79 in). Thus, Sindh is arid and it is only the Indus which irrigates otherwise barren lands of Sindh. Regular surveys have not been carried out to assess the availability of groundwater in the province. Various sources estimate that its volume is between three and five MAF scattered in 28 per cent of the geographical area of Sindh. However, some experts suggest it to be less than these estimates. This water is found mainly along the Indus water channels and in the few natural underground streams. The idea of Sukkur Barrage was conceived by C.A. Fife, in 1868. However, the project was finally sanctioned in 1923. It was constructed under the overall direction of Sir Charlton Harrison, CIE, as chief engineer, while Sir Arnold Musto, CIE, was the architect and engineer of the scheme. The Head Works and Canals were completed by 1932. On its completion it was opened by The 1st Earl of Willingdon, Viceroy of India. The scheme had been launched by the Governor of Bombay, Sir George Lloyd (later known as Lord Lloyd), and it was named in his honour. Pandurang K Shinde [ Esqr, B. A, I.S.E ] offered his engineering services, who was later responsible for Radhanagari Dam in Maharashtra, India, Syed Ghulam Mustafa of the Imperial Service also played an instrumental role in the design and construction of the barrage. Indian civil engineer M.Vishveswaraya lent his services for the development of the waterworks.

To revitalise its water storage capacity and distribution efficiency, the Government of Pakistan embarked upon major rehabilitation work of Sukkur Barrage. The work was started by Pakistan Army Engineering Corps and Frontier Works Organisation (FWO) on 22 November 2004, and was completed ahead of the deadline in July 2005, with the cost of just 15 million US$ (US dollars). Experts believe that the rehabilitation of the barrage has enhanced its efficiency for another 60 to 70 years.

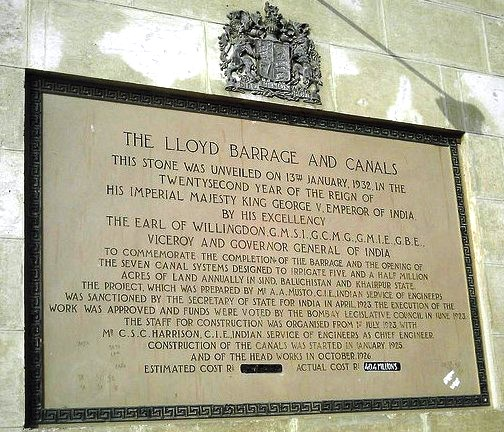
Plaque at the Lloyd Barrage (Sukkur Barrage)

== Functioning ==
Sukkur Barrage is used to control water flow in the River Indus for the purposes of irrigation and flood control. This barrage enables water to flow through what was originally a network of seven canals 10,417 kilometres (6,473 mi) long, feeding the largest irrigation system in the world, with more than 7.63 million acres of irrigated land which forms about 25% of total canal irrigated area of the country. The retaining wall of the barrage has 66 spans (outfall gates), each 18 metres (60 ft) wide and weighing 50 tons.

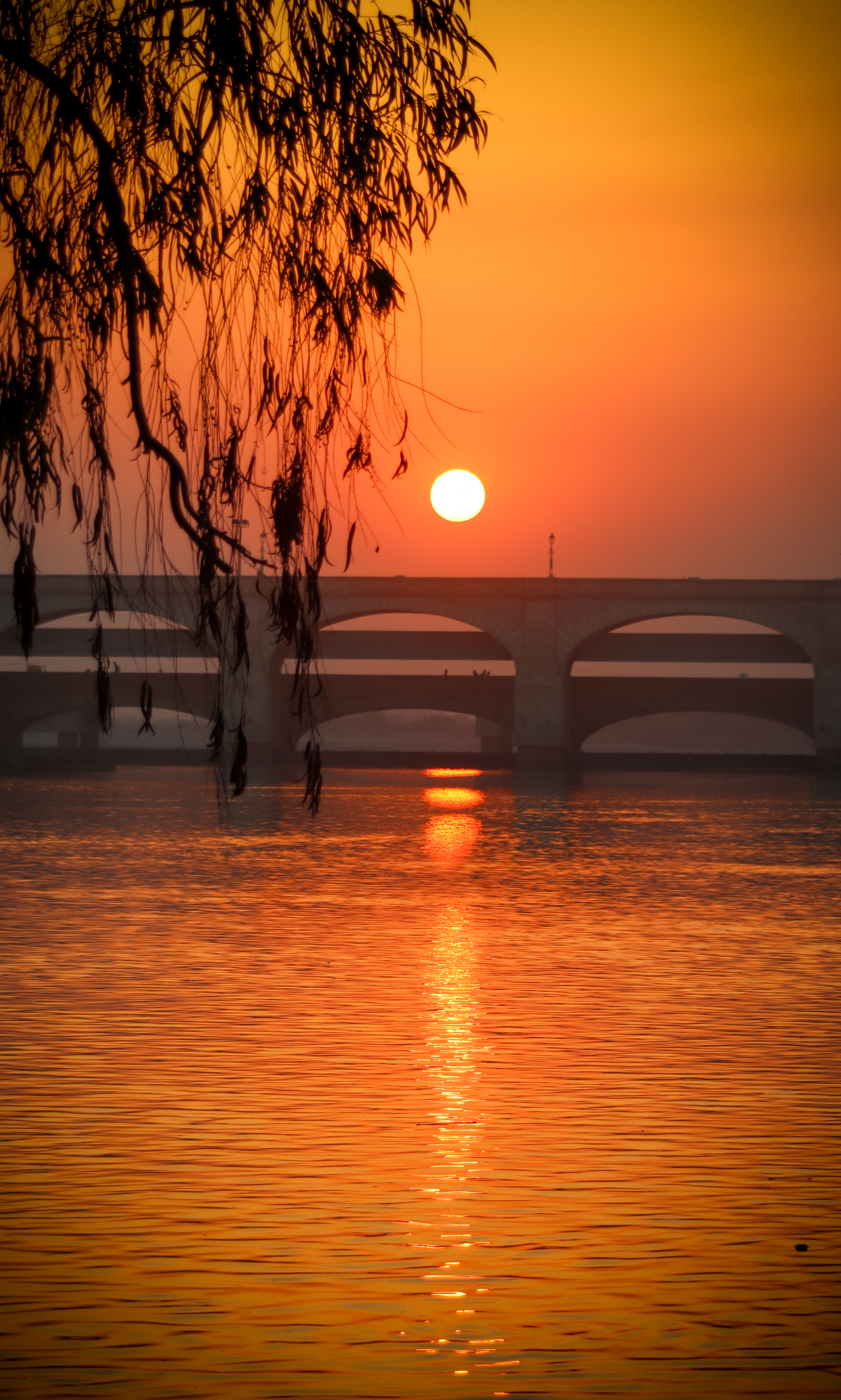
Indus river Sukkur barrage sunset

The Nara Canal which is one of the seven canals off taking from this barrage is the longest canal of this country, carrying discharge almost equal to that of the River Thames at London and its bed width which is 105 metres (346 ft) and 1 1/2 times as big as the Suez Canal. In fact Nara Canal is not a man-made canal as it was the southernmost part of Hakro River which emanated from the foothills of Sutlej which after traversing through the Punjab and Bhawalpur plains joined Nara through Raini River, the remnants of which are still exiting in Ghotki District of Sindh Province. This canal caters for an area of 930,000 hectares (2,300,000 acres).

The next largest canal is Rohri Canal which though slightly shorter in length than Nara Canal is yet taking discharge much more than the former. It has cultivable area of 1,100,000 hectares (2,600,000 acres) settled for irrigation. Cotton, wheat, and sugar cane are the main crops grown on this canal system. All the four canals on the left and two canals on the right bank of River Indus are perennial canals, delivering irrigation supplies all the year round. The seventh canal namely, Rice Canal on the right side is a seasonal canal which flows only in kharif season and is designed for rice cultivation. The N.W. Canal on the right bank provides perennial irrigation for an area of 391,000 hectares (965,000 acres) out of which 74,000 hectares (184,000 acres) are situated in Baluchistan province.

== Wildlife ==
Indus river dolphins are usually seen upstream of the barrage.

== See also ==
- List of barrages and headworks in Pakistan
- List of dams and reservoirs in Pakistan
