= International reaction to the Russo-Georgian War =

The international reaction to the Russo-Georgian War covered many nations, non-governmental organisations, and non-state actors. The conflict began in August 2008 in South Ossetia but spread to other parts of Georgia. The war had a considerable humanitarian impact and affected the financial markets of Russia and Georgia.

In general, Georgia accused Russia of aggression, whereas Russia accused Georgia of genocide and crimes against humanity targeting Ossetians and Russian peacekeepers. Most other countries called for peace, with some demanding respect for Georgia's territorial integrity while others supported Russian intervention. The Russian invasion of its US-aligned neighbor caused Russia–United States relations to plummet for the first time since the end of the Cold War and led to heated verbal exchanges. In the next year, the new US administration chose a policy of the reset.

== National statements ==
Country	Response
Argentina	Argentine Foreign Ministry stated on August 8 that the Argentine government "deplores the violence, and exhorts involved parties to avoid any escalation that could worsen the conflict", and hopes that "peace is immediately restored in the region."
Armenia	The Armenian Foreign Ministry said on 8 August, "We are certainly concerned about the situation and hope that a solution will be found very quickly. Armenian Defense Minister Seyran Ohanyan declared that the conflict was Georgia's internal matter, but peace in Armenia's neighboring country was preferred. On 9 August 2008, the Armenian Consulate in Batumi organized the evacuation of Armenian citizens from Georgia. The Armenian Foreign Ministry urged Armenian citizens to refrain from visiting Georgia. The Armenian Foreign Ministry announced on 10 August that Armenia would not collect visa fees from foreigners entering from Georgia. The Armenian Foreign Ministry reported on 11 August that Armenia had facilitated the evacuation of 2500 foreigners from Georgia. On 10 August 2008, the Armenian Defense Ministry rejected reports that the Russian planes based in Gyumri were bombing the Georgian territory. On 12 August 2008, Armenian Transport Minister Gurgen Sarkisian said that deliveries from Georgia were not hindered. On 13 August 2008, Armenian president Serzh Sargsyan called his Russian counterpart Dmitry Medvedev and expressed condolences. On 14 August 2008, Armenian president Serzh Sargsyan sent a letter of condolences to Georgian president Mikheil Saakashvili and promised humanitarian assistance. Following Russia's recognition of Abkhazia and South Ossetia, the Armenian Foreign Ministry stated that the Nagorno-Karabakh conflict, along with other conflicts in the Caucasus, should be resolved "on the basis of a free expression of peoples' will." Armenian president Serzh Sargsyan told Russian president Dmitry Medvedev during their meeting on 2 September that Armenia would aid Russia to "eliminate consequences of the humanitarian disaster". In November 2008, President Sargsyan discussed the EU compensation of war damages for Armenia with José Manuel Barroso, President of the European Commission. WikiLeaks revealed in 2011 that US diplomat Joseph S. Pennington had reported that Georgian Foreign Minister Eka Tkeshelashvili refused to meet with her Armenian counterpart Eduard Nalbandyan while she had flight from Yerevan. It was also reported that Armenian president Sargsyan could not establish phone contact with his Georgian counterpart Saakashvili after a phone call with Russian president Medvedev, and that the Prime Minister of Georgia was also ignoring phone calls from his Armenian counterpart. Armenian foreign minister Eduard Nalbandyan was quoted as saying that Armenia did not want to agitate Armenians in Samtskhe–Javakheti against Tbilisi.
Australia	Prime Minister Kevin Rudd urged on 10 August to cease hostilities and supported Georgia's territorial integrity. He said, "At a minimum, we need to see a ceasefire." Opposition leader Julie Bishop also called for the ceasefire. Foreign Minister Stephen Smith said that Australian representatives would call on Russian officials to cease hostilities. The Russian ambassador to Australia would be handed an official request for a ceasefire. However, Australian and international calls for a ceasefire, in addition to the Georgian offer of a ceasefire on 10 August, were rejected by Russia. In September 2008, Australia halted the uranium export deal with Russia in response to the Russian invasion of Georgia.
Austria	On 11 August, Austrian foreign minister Ursula Plassnik called for a ceasefire and asked Russia to respect Georgia's territorial integrity.
Azerbaijan	A spokesman for the Azeri Foreign Ministry, Khazar Ibrahim, said on August 8 that Georgian actions were in accord with international law and that Azerbaijan supported the territorial integrity of Georgia. Modern Musavat Party stated on 9 August that the war was the fault of the Russian peacekeepers, who were supporting South Ossetian separatists, and the UN Security Council must take steps to resolve the conflict. The leader of Azerbaijan's state oil company said on 9 August that his country had stopped exporting oil through Georgia's Black Sea ports. The Azerbaijani Foreign Ministry announced on 11 August that Azerbaijan had eased the visa regime for foreign citizens evacuating from Georgia. The Russian ambassador, Vasili Istratov, decided to organize a press conference on 11 August, open only to journalists who were not critical of Russia. One anonymous official told The New York Times that the success of the Russian invasion and failure of international community to strongly react sent a dangerous signal to Azerbaijan. President Ilham Aliyev supported the territorial integrity of Georgia. On 14 August 2008, the Azerbaijani Health Ministry sent 25 tons of medicines to Georgia. President Aliyev declared during his meeting with Turkish prime minister Recep Tayyip Erdoğan on 20 August that the conflict in Georgia was damaging Azerbaijan economically. On 20 August, President Aliyev declared that both Russia and Georgia were friends of Azerbaijan and Azerbaijan preferred that Russia and Georgia become friends too. Aliyev met with President of Romania Traian Băsescu on 21 August to discuss the situation in Georgia. In September 2008, Russian president Dmitry Medvedev and Ilham Aliyev did not reach an understanding on the August conflict. In October 2008, Foreign Minister Elmar Mammadyarov said that Russia complied with Azerbaijan's request not to touch Azerbaijani-owned infrastructure in Georgia during the war. 58% of Azerbaijan's population supported the country's NATO membership in 2007, and after the Russian invasion of Georgia, this number fell to 48% by 2009.
Bangladesh	The caretaker government's Foreign Advisor, Iftekhar Ahmed Chowdhury, said on August 10, "This outbreak of violence is a matter of deep concern for the international community, including Bangladesh. We hope for an early cessation of hostilities."
Belarus	According to The Guardian, after the Russian invasion, pro-Russian Belarus was "trembling", being "strangely" speechless for days before the "last dictatorship in Europe" decided to back Russia. Maria Vanshina, Deputy Head for Information of Ministry of Foreign Affairs said, "The use of military force in the zone of South Ossetia, civilian casualties, bloodshed, economic losses, ruined peaceful life of people cause a deep concern in us. Only immediate ceasefire, peaceful and civilized manner of negotiating will secure stability in the South Ossetian region and across the Caucasus." After the Russian ambassador to Belarus commented on 12 August on the "modest silence" of Belarus, the next day, President of Belarus Alexander Lukashenko expressed his support for South Ossetian civilians and promised aid. The president's press service issued a statement saying, "The Belarussian people, like all Russians, is in mourning over the victims of the tragedy and shares the concerns of those who lost relatives, their homes and their livelihoods. May they have strength and courage in overcoming the consequences of this humanitarian catastrophe." Earlier, the Foreign Ministry had only called for a ceasefire. Prime Minister Sergey Sidorsky announced on 14 August the sending of humanitarian relief. He said that Belarus would accommodate several thousand children for the next two months. The president of Belarus, Alexander Lukashenko, said on 19 August, "Russia acted calmly, wisely and beautifully". Lukashenko met Russian president Medvedev in Sochi on 19 August. On 20 August 2008, Lukashenko received the presidents of Abkhazia and South Ossetia in Minsk. Lukashenko declared that there had been "no war" but a "beautiful operation". In September 2008, President Lukashenko told The Financial Times that it was "absolutely idiotic" to propose that Russia would repeat the Georgian scenario in Belarus. Lukashenko said that the western influence prevented the post-Soviet states from recognizing Abkhazia and South Ossetia.
Belgium	On 20 August 2008, Belgian Foreign Minister Karel De Gucht said that the war demonstrated that accepting Georgia into NATO was risky. In September 2008, Foreign Minister Karel De Gucht said that events in Georgia should not influence the timetable of Georgia's accession to NATO. He also said that he was against the EU membership for Ukraine and Georgia. On 15 September, Karel De Gucht said that Belgium would initially refrain from participation in the EU monitoring mission. He noted the uncertainty whether the monitors would be able to enter Abkhazia and South Ossetia: "If Europeans can only deploy in the security zone, that gives me a bad feeling, as, basically, we will have to protect borders which we have not recognised." On 25 September 2008, Senator Josy Dubié said that Belgium must block Georgia's NATO membership.
Bosnia and Herzegovina	The Government of Republika Srpska sent condolences to the families of those South Ossetians who were killed during the war. Its August 14 statement condemned Georgia for taking unilateral military action and called Russia's actions "legitimate".
Brazil	The Brazilian Foreign Ministry stated on August 8, "Brazil deplores the use of violence and supports the peaceful solution of disputes. Brazil urges the parties involved to seek dialogue, for an immediate cease-fire and reconciliation in order to restore peace and security in the region, based on International Law."
Bulgaria	The Spokesman of the Ministry of Foreign Affairs declared in a statement on August 8 that "the reports of victims among the civilian population in the region and in the town of Tskhinvali cause particular anxiety." Bulgarian Minister of Foreign Affairs Ivailo Kalfin stated on August 10, "Bulgaria supports a strong and active European position on the conflict in South Ossetia."
Canada	Canada's Minister of Foreign Affairs, David Emerson, stated on August 8, "We call for an immediate halt to the hostilities and strongly urge all parties involved to display restraint in words and deeds, and to respect national boundaries." On 10 August, Minister of Foreign Affairs David Emerson stated, "I am very concerned about the expansion of hostilities well beyond the region of South Ossetia. Rather than acting as a neutral peacekeeper, Russia has escalated the hostilities through its attacks on Georgian towns and cities outside the conflict zone. Canada calls on Russia to respect Georgia's borders and to desist from any further encroachment on Georgia's territorial integrity." On 27 August, International Co-operation Minister Bev Oda announced an additional $2 million in humanitarian aid.
Chile	On August 11, Foreign Minister Alejandro Foxley called for a cease-fire, "because the worst from these situations, where territories are disputed, is the large amount of victims, who are absolutely innocent people."
China	A spokesman for the Ministry of Foreign Affairs Qin Gang said on August 10, "China calls upon relevant parties to keep restraint and cease fire immediately." China called for an Olympic truce. President of China Hu Jintao told US president George W. Bush that China wanted the immediate cessation of hostilities in South Ossetia. High-ranking government source told Russian Interfax agency that China wanted to maintain good relations with both Georgia and Russia. In late August 2008, a Chinese Foreign Ministry spokesman said that "the latest development in South Ossetia and Abkhazia" alarmed China. The Russian foreign ministry released a statement on 28 August 2008 saying that the Chinese ambassador to Russia expressed his understanding regarding the Russian decision to recognize Abkhazia and South Ossetia.
Croatia	The Croatian United Nations ambassador appealed for an Olympic Truce on 8 August 2008. At follow-up United Nations Security Council meeting, the ambassador said that Russia's "actions in the past days go far beyond the role of a peacekeeper as foreseen in the 1992 armistice agreement among Georgian, Russian and South Ossetian leaders."
Cuba	A statement from Cuban President Raúl Castro stated on August 11, "When the USSR disintegrated, South Ossetia, annexed by force by Georgia, with which it shared neither nationality nor culture, retained its status as an autonomous republic with its local authorities and its capital, Tskhinvali." He further claimed, "It is a false claim that Georgia is defending its national sovereignty."
Czech Republic	On 8 August 2008, the Ministry of Foreign Affairs (Czech Republic) expressed its concern over the hostilities. Spokeswoman at the Czech Foreign Ministry, Zuzana Opletalová, said on August 9 that the Czech Republic called on all parties to halt military operations and supported Georgia's territorial integrity. According to Opletalová, Russia had become a party to the conflict, and the Czech Foreign Ministry would support the deployment of international peacekeeping troops. An evacuation of Czech citizens from Georgia would be organized. There were five Czech UN observers in Abkhazia. The Czech Foreign Ministry released a statement fully supporting Georgia's territorial integrity and indirectly blaming Russia for the crisis. However, Czech President Václav Klaus, stated that the conflict in Georgia was linked to the Kosovo precedent, which gave Russia an excuse. He said he refused "to accept this widespread, simplified interpretation which paints the Georgians as the victims and the Russians as the villains" and rejected comparison with 1968 Czechoslovakia saying that Subcarpathian Ruthenia was not attacked and that Czechoslovak leader Alexander Dubček could not be compared with President Saakashvili. In September 2008, Prime Minister of the Czech Republic Mirek Topolánek said that NATO had erred by not offering a candidate status to Georgia and Ukraine in April 2008.
Denmark	Prime Minister Anders Fogh Rasmussen condemned Russian aggression on August 9: "We have to insist that the sovereignty of Georgia be respected. There are no military solutions. There is only one solution: diplomatic negotiation." In April 2009, Denmark announced readiness to help Georgia to restore its defense capabilities in the aftermath of the war.
Estonia	On 4 August 2008, Estonia urged the European Union to send international peacekeepers to the conflict zones in Georgia. Estonian president Toomas Hendrik Ilves called Georgian president Saakashvili on 8 August. Ilves expressed condolences for the deaths. He said that the Russian intervention in the conflict would not contribute to the resolution of the conflict, and it was regrettable that South Ossetia did not use the opportunity offered by Georgia. Foreign Minister Urmas Paet called his Georgian counterpart Eka Tkeshelashvili on 9 August and promised support in defense against the cyberattacks. Prime minister Andrus Ansip said that Russia escalated the conflict and was bombing the targets outside the South Ossetian conflict zone, which made clear that the Russian actions were not peacekeeping, but aggression against Georgia. The Estonian Foreign Ministry issued a recommendation for the Estonian citizens to leave Georgia. The Estonian parliament Riigikogu denounced on 12 August the military aggression of the Russian Federation against Georgia, comparing Russian actions with Nazi Germany's attack on Czechoslovakia and Poland. The Riigikogu urged the international community "to assist Georgia in every way possible" and supported "the accelerated accession of Georgia to NATO". Estonian president Ilves said on 14 August that the Russian attack on Georgia should be considered a persuasive argument for the conferral of NATO membership to Georgia and Ukraine. President Ilves said, "The decision in Bucharest was interpreted as a green light in Russia. Basically, I think it backfired." According to the Georgian defense ministry, the Estonian government had deployed 50 service members to defend Georgia and ensure the Russian withdrawal. Foreign Minister Urmas Paet, while traveling from Tbilisi to Gori on August 16, commented on Russia's compliance with the ceasefire agreement, saying, "I don't see why they signed it if they don't want to implement it." Estonian Defense Minister Jaak Aaviksoo said on 13 September 2008 that the "Russian bear" does not change with the passing of years and that the West has lost all hope that it and Russia could share common values. In October 2008, President Ilves cautioned the European Union against quick improvement of ties with Russia. In December 2008, the Estonian defense ministry announced that Estonia was ready to receive the Georgian soldiers injured in August 2008 for treatment.
Finland	Foreign Minister Alexander Stubb said in a statement on August 8 that he had communicated with Georgian and South Ossetian authorities on the evening of 7 August and told them to resume negotiations. Stubb was going to contact the foreign ministries of Russia, the United States, France, Germany, and Georgia. Stubb was sending his Special Envoy Ambassador Heikki Talvitie to Georgia. Stubb's vacation in Italy was cut short. On 11 August 2008, Finnish president Tarja Halonen talked by phone with Russian president Dmitry Medvedev and urged to halt the hostilities.
France	The French Foreign Ministry issued a statement backing Georgia's territorial integrity on August 8. French foreign minister Bernard Kouchner was in communication with all sides of the conflict. President Nicolas Sarkozy's office stated on 9 August saying that EU foreign ministers would hold a meeting to debate solutions, such as a prompt cessation of hostilities, "full respect" for Georgia's territorial integrity and restoration of the pre-war situation. France, president of the European Union, stated, "It (the EU presidency) demands an immediate ceasefire. It welcomes the offer of the ceasefire from Georgia and expects from Russia that it will immediately accept such a ceasefire." France stated that Europe "underscores that the military actions (against Georgia) could affect EU-Russian relations." On 10 August 2008, Sarkozy announced a plan to settle the conflict. He also said that he had discussed the situation in Georgia with the officials from Georgia, the United Kingdom, Ukraine, Spain, and Italy. Sarkozy was planning to talk with the leaders of Russia, Germany, Poland and the USA. Before he departed for Tbilisi on 10 August, Foreign Minister Bernard Kouchner labelled the South Ossetian conflict as "massacres" and said he would urge in a "message of peace" both Georgia and Russia "to stop the fighting immediately". Kouchner also told Le Parisien newspaper, "We are facing an escalation of violence [that is] unacceptable at the doors of Europe. This reminds me all too much of other recent conflicts that have torn our continent apart, particularly in the Balkans." Kouchner visited Georgia on 11 August along with Finnish foreign minister Alexander Stubb. They both denounced Russia's hostile actions in Georgia. Kouchner told Saakashvili in Gori "that the war must stop", adding he was "not in the business of blaming people". Kouchner was expected to bring draft ceasefire endorsed by Saakashvili to the Kremlin during that night, while President Sarkozy would visit Georgia and Russia the next day. At a two-hour closed meeting of the Security Council on 11 August, France proposed a resolution calling for the ceasefire and withdrawal of the armed forces to the lines of August 6; however, Russian UN envoy Vitaly Churkin ruled out Russian approval of such plans. During the Olympic opening on 8 August in Beijing, Sarkozy told Putin that they had "to find a way out of this crisis," but Putin responded, "I can't let it happen." As French president Nicolas Sarkozy began to mediate between Russia and Georgia, he called Russian president Dmitry Medvedev in Moscow. Although Medvedev wished Georgian president Saakashvili to be "fired", Sarkozy told him, "It's not up to you or me to designate the Georgian leader." Before Sarkozy departed for Moscow, Bush asked him not to go, "You'll arrive at the Kremlin when the Russians are firing missiles at Tbilisi." Sarkozy's meeting with Russian president Medvedev on 12 August was planned to take during lunchtime. When Sarkozy arrived in Moscow, Putin allegedly commented on himself and President Medvedev in presence of Sarkozy on 12 August, "It's just like in the films – there's a good cop and a bad cop." Later, a French presidential aide commented, "For the first time in a major international crisis, it is the Americans who are on the touchline, and it is the European Union that is being called upon to sort things out." Sarkozy said on 12 August, "We do not yet have a peace deal, we have a provisional cessation of hostilities, but this is significant progress." After meeting with the Russian president on 12 August, Sarkozy arrived in Georgia. The drafted ceasefire agreement was largely influenced by Russia's interests, not by respect towards Georgia's sovereignty. This unnerved the United States. Sarkozy declared the agreement on the ceasefire at 2 a.m. on 13 August after meeting with Saakashvili. The ceasefire agreement mentioned "additional security measures", which apparently enabled Russia to occupy the town of Gori on 13 August and take over Georgia's main east-west road connecting the Black Sea coast with the capital Tbilisi. The United States responded by dispatching humanitarian assistance to Tbilisi. Saakashvili did not yield to Sarkozy and only signed the agreement later on 15 August after Rice had convinced him. According to Vladimir Socor, there were signs that the Russians actually wrote the agreement, and Sarkozy effectively became a postman who forced it on Georgia in the face of the threat of Russian occupation of Tbilisi. According to Mark Mardell's source, the original ceasefire negotiated by Kouchner and Stubb supporting Georgia's territorial integrity was scrubbed Sarkozy and replaced with the Russian-prepared document. On 13 August, Sarkozy reported about his dealings with Medvedev and Putin to US president George Bush. The French Foreign Minister Bernard Kouchner said, "Don't ask us who's good and who's bad here. We shouldn't make any moral judgments on this war. Stopping the war, that's what we're interested in." President Nicolas Sarkozy said the ceasefire agreement between Russia and Georgia would take effect after the United Nations Security Council's approval and the establishment of a "mechanism" to supervise compliance. The office of the French president commented on Medvedev's acceptance of the ceasefire on 15 August 2008, "His country will sign a cease-fire accord with Georgia and scrupulously respect all agreements, including a troop withdrawal." Sarkozy said on August 16 that the ceasefire agreement prohibited Russian military presence in "any major urban area" of Georgia. But Sarkozy wrote to Saakashvili that the Russian forces had the authority for monitoring "a few kilometres" near South Ossetia. Kouchner said on 17 August that international peacekeepers should be deployed to South Ossetia and that the ceasefire was not yet stable. Sarkozy told Medvedev by phone that Russian refusal to begin "withdrawal, without delay" would draw "serious consequences" in relations with the EU. Sarkozy later stated if Russia did not "rapidly and totally" withdrew from Georgia, he would "have to call an extraordinary meeting of the Council of the European Union to decide what consequences to draw." After the NATO meeting on 19 August, Kouchner commented on Russian withdrawal, "We are very disappointed, because despite the promise to us, there is no withdrawal of troops. When you sign up to an agreement, you have to respect it." He said that in case of Russian non-compliance with the agreement, a summit on the EU-Russia relationship might be convened by French president Nicolas Sarkozy. Bernard Kouchner said on 21 August, "We are waiting ... for the Russians to respect their word. We waited twice with dashed hopes. This time, it appears that there is at least the beginning of a fulfillment." On 23 August, President Sarkozy approved the Russian pullout from Georgia. He called on Russia to withdraw from Poti and Senaki, where the main Georgian air base was located. Sarkozy convened a special meeting of EU member states in Brussels on 1 September, during which EU-Russia relations and assistance for Georgia would be discussed. On 27 August, Kouchner said that Russia violated international law by recognizing Abkhazia and South Ossetia. Kouchner commented about an ethnic cleansing in South Ossetia, "I hope that didn't happen overnight. But there has already been evidence that the armies are pushing away the Ossetians who favored Georgia, and in a certain way, yes, an ethnic cleansing is taking place." Kouchner said that the situation was "very dangerous". Kouchner said, "There are other objectives that one can suppose are the objectives of Russia, in particular Crimea, Ukraine and Moldova." In response, Russian foreign minister Sergey Lavrov said that Kouchner had a "sick imagination". Sarkozy addressed the French diplomatic corps. Sarkozy defended the ceasefire agreement: "When I travelled to Moscow on August 12 - in midsummer - to obtain a halt to the fighting in Georgia, wasn't the fate of tens of thousands of men, women and children hanging in the balance?" Sarkozy declared that Russia must fully observe the ceasefire agreement and called the Russian decision to "unilaterally" recognise breakaway states in Georgia "quite unacceptable". Sarkozy further stated, "Nobody wants to return to the time of the Cold War." He said, "NATO is not an adversary but a partner of Russia. As for the European Union, it seeks to build with this country a close and positive relation. It is for Russia today to make a fundamental choice." During the phone conversation between French president Nicolas Sarkozy and Russian president Medvedev, Sarkozy stressed the importance of fully implementing the six-point plan. On 28 August, Kouchner commented on the agenda of an extraordinary EU meeting convened on 1 September at France's initiative, "Sanctions are being considered." This marked the first time the country warmed to Russia, proposing a drastic action against it. Kouchner further stated, "I do not want to prejudge the issue before the EU summit on Georgia has taken place. But we will work hard with our 26 partners to draft a strong statement that signifies our refusal to accept the situation in Georgia. France does not support breaking off relations with Russia. This will have to be sorted out through negotiation. This will take time; we are not deluding ourselves." Kouchner told the BBC on 31 August that France would not endorse sanctions against Russia at the EU summit in Brussels, convened by France on 1 September, "The situation is very difficult and... we must be firm on our position in offering a line defending, of course, territorial integrity of Georgia." Earlier, Kouchner had threatened sanctions. On 8 September 2008, Sarkozy negotiated a new agreement with Medvedev to withdraw Russian troops from Georgia within a month. Sarkozy was accompanied by José Manuel Barroso, President of the European Commission, and Javier Solana, High Representative of the Union for Foreign Affairs and Security Policy. During meeting near Moscow, Sarkozy threatened Medvedev that he would leave and could not be able to prevent Europe from implementing sanctions against Medvedev. According to Kouchner, Sarkozy finally managed to get Medvedev's signature on the ceasefire document. On 16 September 2008, the French Libération newspaper refused to print a condolence text for the South Ossetian victims of the war, paid for by the Russian embassy in France. On 19 September 2008, Prime Minister of France François Fillon said during his meeting with Putin in Sochi that France was pleased that Russia was fulfilling its obligations under Sarkozy-Medvedev agreement. Fillon announced that the European Union would resume negotiations with Russia in October 2008 if the Russian forces completely left undisputed Georgia. An article published in Newsweek pondered what could have been achieved if any other country had led the EU in the ceasefire negotiations instead of France, because France's great power status compelled Russia to make concessions. On 27 September 2008, Bernard Kouchner commented on the Sarkozy-Medvedev ceasefire agreement, "As we did not want to go to war, we had to accept a compromise... Do not think I am proud of getting that document." He further said, "They, the Russians, resisted us. It would have been easy for them to go for the Georgian capital and take it. They were strongly prepared... [...] We'll see if it is a trap - if they do not implement the agreements they signed." Kouchner also said, "In the EU, we want to maintain a dialogue with Russia." On 10 October 2008, Kouchner visited Georgia. He noted that Russia had only "partly" fulfilled its obligations as Russian forces had not left Akhalgori and Perevi. On 13 October 2008, Kouchner announced that Abkhaz and South Ossetian representatives were invited to attend the talks in Geneva scheduled on October 15. The Russian Foreign Ministry official said that Russia would not attend the talks without Abkhaz and Ossetians. On 21 October 2008, Sarkozy said at the European Parliament that the Russian "aim was to overthrow Mr. Saakashvili" in August 2008. He continued, "Europe should no longer be an accomplice of another Cold War" and "I don't believe the world needs a crisis between Europe and Russia". On 22 October 2008, French minister Jean-Pierre Jouyet said that Georgia's NATO membership was "not in the interests of Europe or its relations with Russia." In November 2008, Sarkozy declared at a ceremony in Paris, "I remember the American president's call the day before our departure for Moscow: 'Don't go there; they [the Russians] want to go to Tbilisi; they're 40km away. Don't go, [just] condemn it'." Sarkozy further said, "When someone had to leave for Moscow or Tbilisi, who defended human rights? Was it the President of the United States who said, 'This is unacceptable'? Or was it France which kept up the dialogue [with Russia]? . . . We were in Moscow and, as if by chance, the ceasefire was announced." In July 2009, the Georgian town of Sachkhere awarded the title of honorary citizen to the French ambassador to Georgia, Eric Fournier, for his defense of the Sachkhere military training center against Russian invaders in August 2008. WikiLeaks revealed in November 2010 that, according to the US ambassador's report, French president Sarkozy had grabbed Russian foreign minister Sergey Lavrov and called him a liar during negotiations in August 2008.
Germany	On 8 August, Foreign Minister Frank-Walter Steinmeier said that he was "appalled by the escalation of violence" and demanded that "all combat has to be ceased immediately". Steinmeier said on 10 August, "We face the danger of a dangerous conflagration." Deputy Foreign Minister Gernot Erler accused Georgia of noncompliance with a 1992 ceasefire agreement, calling it "a question of a violation of international law". Although Erler conceded to South Ossetian provocation, he still endorsed the Russian position. Eckart von Klaeden, foreign policy spokesman for the Christian Democratic Union in parliament, said Russia was also responsible for the crisis. The German Foreign Ministry announced that 200 German citizens had left Georgia, and another 300 remained. Italian and Polish citizens were evacuated by their countries. German chancellor Angela Merkel urged self-control on August 8. On 11 August, German chancellor Angela Merkel conveyed her concern about the humanitarian situation in Georgia and urged to cease war. Brigadier General Heinz G Wagner, the German military attache in Moscow, authored an internal paper on 11 August, in which he called the Russian military action in Georgia "appropriate". He wrote, "The extent of the use of military force by the Russian side appears – seen from here and despite reports to the contrary from Georgia and the picture conveyed by the media – not inappropriately high." Merkel's spokesman said on 14 August that Georgia's territorial integrity was "sacrosanct for Germany." Chancellor Angela Merkel said during her meeting with Medvedev on 15 August, "to say that I found some of Russia's actions disproportionate and in particular think the presence of Russian troops in Georgia proper is not sensible. Russian troops should withdraw from central areas in Georgia." But she said, "Both sides are probably to blame." She said that NATO's offer to Georgia to become the alliance's member still held. Merkel saw alleged proof of Georgian atrocities provided by Russians, but she only commented that "every war is terrible." Merkel also told the news conference, "We very much want the six-point plan to be implemented very promptly so that Russian troops are no longer in Georgia, outside Abkhazia and South Ossetia." Former Chancellor Gerhard Schröder claimed by August 16 that the conflict began with "Georgian invasion of South Ossetia". When asked if he thought "the American military advisors stationed in Tbilisi encouraged Georgia to launch its attack", he responded, "I wouldn't go that far. But everyone knows that these US military advisors in Georgia exist – a deployment that I've never considered particularly intelligent. And it would have been strange if these experts had not had any information. Either they were extremely unprofessional, or they were truly fooled, which is hard to imagine," he said. "I assume that no one in the Moscow leadership has an interest in military conflicts." He went on to say that "there have indeed been serious mistakes made by the West in its policy toward Russia." He described Saakashvili as a "gambler", and claimed that Russia was not pursuing annexation. Chancellor Merkel arrived in Georgia on 17 August. She urged Russia to comply with the ceasefire agreement signed on 16 August. Merkel said, "The cease-fire was signed by President Medvedev on Saturday, and this must happen in the next few days." Merkel said at the Georgian president's palace on 17 August, "I expect a very fast, very prompt withdrawal of Russian troops out of Georgia." Merkel stated that "this process should not drag out for weeks." Merkel said, "This is an urgent matter." Merkel said that international peacekeepers must be deployed to Georgia promptly. She also backed Georgia's aspiration for NATO membership. Saakashvili called Merkel "brave". Merkel stated, "In December, we will have a first evaluation of the situation and we are on a clear path in the direction of Nato membership." Merkel's spokesman said on August 27 that Merkel had told Russian president Medvedev that Russian military deployment in undisputed Georgian territory, such as in Poti, constituted "a grave violation" of the ceasefire agreement. Foreign Minister Frank-Walter Steinmeier said in late August 2008 that "the dangerous spiral of violence [over Georgia] must be stopped", adding, "We need a strong and sensible European role to allow a return to reason and responsibility." He had earlier dismissed the proposal of sanctions, saying, "someone should first tell me what a sanction against Russia could be", adding, "Particularly in such a serious political situation, it is necessary to show a bit of common sense. We will continue to have Russia as our neighbour also beyond the current day, and it is in our own interest to return to a normal relationship." Angela Merkel declared in September 2008 that the EU had "adequately" responded to Russia's moves in Georgia and would continue cooperation with Russia. She rejected the American proposal to exclude Russia from the Group of Eight.
Greece	Greek Foreign Ministry announced on 9 August 2008 that they would be monitoring the situation in the Caucasus. On 13 August, Foreign Minister Dora Bakoyannis proposed four goals: strict compliance with the ceasefire; actual cessation of hostilities; restoration of the pre-war status quo; and the start of negotiations. She expressed support for Sarkozy's work through the EU, and talked of "providing economic aid amounting to 100,000 euros" to South Ossetian refugees. The Panhellenic Socialist Movement (PASOK) called for peace, the Communist Party of Greece blamed imperialism, and the Popular Orthodox Rally (LAOS) said that those who pushed Georgians into the conflict should be ashamed. On 14 August, the Greek Ministry of Foreign Affairs announced that a Greek diaspora member, Ivan Mihailidis, was killed in the capital of South Ossetia, while his three family members remain in the town, and that in Vladikavkaz, 25 refugees were members of the Greek diaspora or their families; the Greek government provided financial aid to the Greek diaspora families. In December 2008, Foreign Minister Dora Bakoyannis demanded the return of the OSCE monitors to South Ossetia.
Hungary	On August 14, Hungarian opposition leader Viktor Orbán called the Russian intervention an "imperialist abuse of raw power" and drew parallels with the smashing of the Hungarian Revolution of 1956.
Iceland	On August 8, the Icelandic Minister for Foreign Affairs Ingibjörg Sólrún Gísladóttir expressed concern for the safety of civilians and called for a peaceful solution to the conflict as soon as possible.
Iran	Foreign Ministry spokesman Hassan Ghashghavi called "for an immediate halt to the clashes" and said that "Iran is ready to offer any help ... under its principal policies of contributing to the establishment of peace and stability in the region." President of Iran Mahmoud Ahmadinejad, during his meeting with Russian president Medvedev in Dushanbe in late August, commented on the post-war situation that "the common enemies do not want Russia and the Islamic Republic to become powerful forces". In September 2008, Minister of Foreign Affairs of Iran Manouchehr Mottaki visited the countries of the Caucasus to discuss achieving peace in the region. Iranian president Ahmadinejad said at the 63rd session of the United Nations General Assembly that the peoples of the Caucasus became "a victim of NATO provocation". In February 2009, the Iranian ambassador to Russia, Seyed Mahmoud-Reza Sajjadi, stated that Iran sympathized with the peoples of Abkhazia and South Ossetia but was not yet ready to recognize their independence.
Ireland	Irish Minister for Foreign Affairs Micheál Martin said on August 11, "Ireland fully supports Georgian sovereignty and territorial integrity. I welcome the Georgian offer of a ceasefire and call on all parties to immediately accept this. [...] Ireland stands ready to contribute to relief efforts there."
Israel	The Israeli Ministry of Foreign Affairs stated on August 10, "Israel recognizes the territorial integrity of Georgia and calls for a peaceful solution." Israeli media reported on August 13 that the Orthodox Jews believed that the blessing of Rabbi Aharon Yehuda Leib Shteinman saved Georgia from full occupation. The Israeli Chamber of Commerce and the Israeli Embassy in Georgia financed the medical treatment of 5 injured Georgian service members in Israel in September 2008. In September 2008, it was reported that the Israeli government had prohibited business trips and arms sales to Georgia. In June 2009, a source in the Israeli Defense Ministry told The Jerusalem Post that Israel had reduced arms supplies to Georgia due to Russian pressure. WikiLeaks revealed in 2012 that before the 2008 war (where Georgia used Israeli arms), Israel awarded Russia with "data link codes" for drones. Russia reciprocated the favor by giving out the codes for Tor-M1 systems purchased by Iran.
Italy	On 8 August, the Italian Government stated, "Italy calls on all parties to bring an immediate end to the violence and reach a lasting cessation of hostilities." On 10 August, Italian citizens evacuated to Armenia and Turkey. Italian Minister of Foreign Affairs Franco Frattini said on 11 August that he would contemplate the possibility of dispatching Italian forces to Georgia if French Foreign Minister Bernard Kouchner advised EU intervention. Frattini told ANSA that after phone talks with other G7 foreign ministers, he was "optimistic". Frattini said, "We cannot create an anti-Russia coalition in Europe, and on this point we are close to Putin's position." He emphasised that Vladimir Putin and Italian prime minister Silvio Berlusconi were near partners. Frattini said that "This war has pushed Georgia further away." The Kremlin announced on 14 August that President of Italy Giorgio Napolitano had spoken with Russian president Dmitry Medvedev and expressed condolences to the South Ossetian victims of the war. Frattini said on 26 August that the Russian recognition of Georgia's separatist regions "further complicates an already complicated situation", and "doesn't have international support that makes it legally binding." Former president Francesco Cossiga supported the recognition of Abkhazia and South Ossetia and said that if the right of preservation of the existing borders had really existed, united Italy would not have come into being. Georgian footballer Kakha Kaladze said in September 2008 that Silvio Berlusconi's friendship with Vladimir Putin was instrumental in ending the war, rather than Western diplomacy. Prime Minister Silvio Berlusconi said in November 2008 that the USA provoked Russia by pushing for NATO membership for Georgia and Ukraine.
Japan	On 8 August 2008, the Japanese Foreign Ministry called on all parties to the conflict to cease hostilities and sit at the negotiating table, while reaffirming Japan's commitment to Georgia's territorial integrity.
Kazakhstan	During a phone conversation with Putin on 8 August, the president of Kazakhstan, Nursultan Nazarbayev, said "The Georgian leadership was not right when it failed to inform [other nations] about escalating tensions in South Ossetia" and called for a peaceful solution. On 11 August, the Kazakhstani Foreign Ministry official said that Kazakhstan supported the political settlement to the conflict. Nursultan Nazarbayev supported the Russian recognition of Abkhazia and South Ossetia. Nazarbayev met with Russian president Dmitry Medvedev on 28 August and endorsed Russian peacekeeping actions in South Ossetia. Nazarbayev said that Kazakhstan was sending humanitarian assistance to South Ossetia and Medvedev thanked Nazarbayev. In September 2008, KazMunayGas announced it would no longer build a refinery in Batumi. Agriculture Minister Aqylbek Kurishbaev announced that Kazakhstan would no longer build a new terminal in Poti. In October 2008, Kazakh foreign minister Marat Tajin stated that it was difficult for Kazakhstan to recognize Abkhazia and South Ossetia, because Kazakhstan considered territorial integrity as the top principle in international relations.
Kyrgyzstan	On 11 August 2008, the president of Kyrgyzstan ordered the Foreign Ministry to hold consultations with other members of the Commonwealth of Independent States. On 12 August 2008, member of the Kyrgyz Supreme Council Murat Juraev along with a group of experts left for South Ossetia to study the situation and report to the president of Kyrgyzstan. On 21 August 2008, the Patrotic Party of Kyrgyzstan condemned the Russian attack on Georgia.
Latvia	On 5 August 2008, the Ministry of Foreign Affairs of Latvia expressed its concern over the situation in South Ossetia. On 7 August, the Foreign Ministry urged for the peaceful resolution of the Georgian-Ossetian conflict. On 14 August, the Latvian parliament Saeima stated that Latvia "condemns Russia's military attack on Georgia" and "Russia has violated Georgia's national sovereignty". Saeima stated that "Russia's peace-keeping mission in Georgia has failed; not only border conflicts have remained unresolved, but disproportionate hostilities have been provoked causing the death of civilians and significantly damaging Georgia's civilian and military infrastructure" and called on the NATO members to find solutions "that would strengthen and guarantee the future security of all the neighbouring states of Russia." On 19 August, the Latvian National Armed Forces announced that it was ready to send peacekeepers to Georgia. On 23 October 2008, Latvian Foreign Minister Māris Riekstiņš declared in Moscow that Russia was not completely fulfilling the Medvedev-Sarkozy agreement, because the Russian forces were remaining in the Kodori Valley and Akhalgori Municipality. In May 2009, President of Latvia Valdis Zatlers declared in Washington that Russia's attitude towards the EU, the US, and NATO worsened after the war in Georgia, so the EU policy towards Russia should no longer be "soft".
Lithuania	On the evening of 7 August 2008, the Lithuanian Foreign Ministry supported Georgia's territorial integrity and criticized the latest actions of Russia. A member of the Seimas commented that probable Russian recognition of Abkhazia and South Ossetia in December 2008 would destabilize the region. Lithuanian foreign minister arrived in Georgia on 9 August and met with Georgian counterpart. On 11 August, Lithuania sent a military transporter plane for the evacuation of the Lithuanian citizens to Tbilisi. On 8 October 2008, it was reported that Lithuania would veto the resumption of EU-Russia talks if Russia didn't withdraw its forces from Abkhazia and South Ossetia.
Moldova	Moldovan President Vladimir Voronin called on the European Union to assist to reach a peace settlement of the Transnistria conflict. On 11 August 2008, the Moldovan Foreign Ministry supported the EU statement issued by France on August 8. On 19 September 2008, the People's Assembly of Gagauzia appealed to the president of Moldova and the Moldovan parliament to recognize the independence of Abkhazia and South Ossetia.
Nicaragua	Nicaraguan President Daniel Ortega announced in September 2008 that Nicaragua would recognise "the sister republics of South Ossetia and Abkhazia as the newest members of the world's community of independent nations". Ortega claimed that NATO member states wanted to surround and disintegrate Russia and that they had "used the Georgian government in an operation typical of those launched by the Nazi army." In December 2008, the United States froze $100 million in financial aid for Nicaragua, allegedly for the latter's support of the Russian recognition of South Ossetia. Instead, the funds would be transferred to Georgia.
Netherlands	Dutch Prime Minister Jan-Peter Balkenende spoke with Vladimir Putin and Nicolas Sarkozy in Beijing on August 8. Balkenende stressed the importance of preventing the violence. On 20 October 2008, the Dutch Foreign Ministry announced that an investigation had established that journalist Stan Storimans was killed by a Russian cluster munition.
New Zealand	New Zealand Prime Minister Helen Clark stated on August 11, "We call for an immediate ceasefire and a resumption of negotiations to end the conflict." She urged all sides "to continue to discuss and seek to resolve this matter through the good offices of the United Nations."
Norway	Jens Stoltenberg, Prime Minister of Norway said on August 9 that Norway recognises the sovereignty of Georgia over its own territory. "Our very clear position is that this conflict must be handled at the negotiation table, not the battlefield," he said. Norwegian defense ministry official Espen Barth Eide said on 21 August 2008 that after NATO demanded Russia's withdrawal from Georgia, the Norwegian embassy in Moscow received a call from the Russian defense ministry. The Russian defense ministry official told the Norwegian embassy that Russia would halt all cooperation with NATO.
Poland	Prime Minister Donald Tusk organized the emergency meeting of the European Council in August 2008. On 10 August, the Polish Foreign Ministry urged the European Union to deploy its peacekeepers to the conflict zone. The Polish president, Lech Kaczyński, said, "The president believes that any interference in internal matters of the Republic of Georgia is unacceptable and that any such action, if it intensifies, could lead to tragic consequences." On 12 August, President Kaczyński stated, "We may say that the Russian state has once again shown its face, its true face." However, he called Medvedev's announcement of cessation of hostilities "good news". Kaczynski arrived in Simferopol and met with Ukraine's president. Kaczynski was planning to visit Tbilisi along with Ukrainian and Baltic leaders. Polish pilot refused to fly to Tbilisi due to safety concerns and the Eastern European leaders had to take cars to Tbilisi from Azerbaijan. At a rally in Tbilisi, Kaczynski said, "Our neighbor thinks it can fight us. We are telling it no." On 14 August 2008, Poland and the United States agreed to install an American missile array in Poland. The Russian invasion of Georgia helped to finalize the talks which had been going for 18 months. Polish prime minister Donald Tusk commented on the deal, "Poland and the Poles do not want to be in alliances in which assistance comes at some point later — it is no good when assistance comes to dead people. Poland wants to be in alliances where assistance comes in the very first hours of — knock on wood — any possible conflict." Russian officials were angered; however, American authorities explained that the missile system was aimed at the threats from Iran. The agreement was condemned by Russian president Medvedev, "The deployment of new anti-missile forces has as its aim the Russian Federation. Therefore any fairy tales about deterring other states, fairy tales that with the help of this system, we will deter some sort of rogue states, no longer work." Russian General Anatoliy Nogovitsyn said that this would cause a nuclear attack, "Poland, by deploying the system, is exposing itself to a strike - 100 percent." US State Secretary Condoleezza Rice left for Poland on the evening of 19 August. NATO Secretary General called the Russian nuclear threat against Poland a "pathetic rhetoric." It emerged that Condoleezza Rice and the Polish officials had drunk the Georgian Kindzmarauli wine to celebrate the signing of a deal. Foreign Ministry press spokesman Piotr Paszkowski said, "Poland is clearly in favor of respecting the territorial integrity of Georgia." On 28 August, President Kaczyński heavily criticised the ceasefire agreement drafted by Sarkozy for failing to explicitly recognise Georgia's territorial integrity. EurActiv was told by Russian ambassador to the EU Vladimir Chizhov that a missing reference was "not an omission, it was deliberate," and that Russian president Medvedev was also responsible for the agreement's text. On 7 September 2008, Donald Tusk said that the plans for the construction of Nord Stream 1 should be revised due to the war. On 25 September 2008, President Kaczyński said that his country would suffer if Russia succeeded in sabotaging the diversification of energy routes through Georgia. In May 2009, Stanisław Komorowski, deputy defense minister, said that Poland was increasing military cooperation with the United States because "last year we had Georgia. An independent state was occupied by our partner - Russia." In June 2009, the Polish Defense Ministry announced plans to relocate the Staff of the Polish Land Forces from Warsaw to Wrocław in response to Russian deployment of 9K720 Iskander missiles in Kaliningrad Oblast.
Portugal	The Ministry of Foreign Affairs (Portugal) requested an "immediate cease fire" and supported the EU and OSCE.
Romania	Traian Băsescu, President of Romania said on August 9, "Romania reaffirms the need to respect the sovereignty and territorial integrity of Georgia". He later promised that "Romania will join the efforts of the European Union and NATO efforts contributing its own expertise to promote a negotiated solution that would bring stability to the South Caucasus." Basescu said on August 11, "In Kosovo, so-called collective rights were put ahead of a country's integrity. Now see what is happening in southern Caucasus." "The development is ... that territorial integrity is stepped over in the name of protecting minority rights," he said. "You cannot have that." The presidential administration announced on August 12 that the Romanian authorities would be prepared to evacuate Romanian citizens from Georgia if the situation required so. The Ministry of Foreign Affairs acknowledged that Romanian-made infantry weapons and ammunition delivered to Georgia complied with international law. President Basescu visited Tbilisi on 21 August and brought the humanitarian aid to Georgia. In September 2008, President Basescu declared that Romania did not support sanctions against Russia, because the sanctions could affect the corridor between the Black and Caspian Seas.
Russia	Daniel Fried, the United States Assistant Secretary of State, said that he had talked with Grigory Karasin, the Russian Deputy Foreign Minister, and "we agreed to work together to get the fighting stopped in South Ossetia and encourage political dialogue". However, Karasin accused Georgia for the escalation in the South Ossetian conflict zone, which had "reached a dangerous point." Russian envoy Yuri Popov commented on the Georgian military action against South Ossetian separatists, "Georgia's step is absolutely incomprehensible and shows that the Georgian leadership has zero credit of trust." Popov called on the NATO to reconsider Georgia's bid for membership. Boris Malakhov, a Russian Foreign Ministry spokesman, said that Georgia "should change their minds and return to civilised means of resolving difficult political questions. It is still not too late to prevent a massive bloodbath and new victims, including among civilians." During the night of 8 August, the Russian Foreign Ministry said that "the actions by Georgia in South Ossetia bear witness to the fact that the leadership of that country can no longer be trusted." French president Nicolas Sarkozy told Prime Minister of Russia Vladimir Putin in Beijing, "it's a mistake by Saakashvili. We have to find a way out of this crisis." Putin responded, "I can't let it happen." Prime Minister Vladimir Putin said in Beijing, "It is regrettable that on the day before the opening of the Olympic Games, the Georgian authorities have undertaken aggressive actions in South Ossetia. They have in effect begun hostilities, using tanks and artillery. It is sad, but this will provoke retaliatory measures." Putin further said: "The Georgian leadership has unleashed a dirty adventure. Blood spilled in South Ossetia will be blamed on these people and their associates." Putin said that day, "Heavy weapons and artillery have been sent there, and tanks have been added. Deaths and injuries have been reported, including among Russian peacekeepers. It's all very sad and alarming. And, of course, there will be a response." Putin, who was attending the 2008 Summer Olympics, also said he had talked to President of the United States George W. Bush. Natalya Timakova, the spokesperson of the president of Russia, said on 8 August that the Security Council of Russia would hold the meeting to "consider as soon as possible proposals to settle the situation in the region" at the initiative of Dmitry Medvedev. State Duma deputy Konstantin Zatulin said, "Russia must interfere in the conflict to stop the violence. Russia must consider a military operation because our peacekeeping contingent will not be enough to ensure peace in the region." Chairman of the State Duma Boris Gryzlov said Russia would defend Russian citizens living in South Ossetia. State Duma deputy Vladimir Vasilyev declared that Ukrainian citizens should think about the origins of the weapons being used to kill the South Ossetian children. President Dmitry Medvedev declared on 8 August, "Last night, Georgian troops committed what amounts to an act of aggression against Russian peacekeepers and the civilian population in South Ossetia. What took place is a gross violation of international law and of the mandates that the international community gave Russia as a partner in the peace process. [...] In accordance with the Constitution and the federal laws, as President of the Russian Federation, it is my duty to protect the lives and dignity of Russian citizens wherever they may be. [...] We will not allow the deaths of our fellow citizens to go unpunished. The perpetrators will receive the punishment they deserve." The Permanent Representative of Russia to the United Nations Vitaly Churkin said, "As a result of all of these actions, Tbilisi, the Georgian leadership, has completely lost its credibility as a responsible party in the negotiation process and in international relations, according to the principles of the United Nations." Churkin proposed a statement; however, the UN Security Council did not adopt it and Churkin said the meeting showed the "absence of political will". Ramzan Kadyrov, leader of Chechnya, called on Georgia to "return to civilized ways of solving problems". Kadyrov said that Chechnya was a part of Russia and would not act independently. Dmitry Rogozin, Russian envoy to NATO, called on NATO to refrain from supporting Georgia. Russia would completely terminate air communications with Georgia from midnight on 8 August. The Russian Defence Ministry said that the Russian peacekeepers would be reinforced by the deployment of additional troops "to help end bloodshed". The Russian Foreign Ministry stated that Foreign Minister Sergey Lavrov spoke with Condoleezza Rice three times on 8 August. Lavrov said Russia had information that South Ossetian villages were being "ethnically cleansed", adding, "The number of refugees is growing. A humanitarian crisis is looming." Lavrov responded to the question about Russia's preparedness to wage "all-out war" by saying: "No. Georgia, I believe, started a war in Southern Ossetia, and we are responsible to keep the peace." He added, "We have been appreciative of the American efforts to pacify the hawks in Tbilisi. Apparently, these efforts have not succeeded. Quite a number of officials in Washington were really shocked when all this happened." By 9 August, the Russian authorities accused Saakashvili's relationship with the United States of provoking the war. On 9 August, the Russian Foreign Ministry responded to Ukraine's Foreign Ministry's August 8 statement by saying that Ukraine "had no moral right" to participate in the settlement of the South Ossetian conflict. The Russian Foreign Ministry also said that Georgia was emboldened by Ukraine to commit "ethnic cleansing" in South Ossetia. President Medvedev met with the Russian military officials. He said, "People who are responsible for this humanitarian catastrophe [in South Ossetia] must be held responsible." He further stated: "They [the Russian troops] are also responsible for protecting the population. That's what we are doing now." Dmitry Rogozin, Russian envoy to NATO, said Russia would not hold any "consultations" with Georgia until the latter would restore "the status quo". The Russian foreign minister told the BBC that Russia's aim was not a full-scale war with Georgia, but defence of South Ossetian civilians. "Mr Saakashvili keeps saying that we want to chop off a part of Georgian territory. He's also saying that this is not just about Georgia, this is about the future of Europe because he says Russia is also making territorial claims to other [countries], including the Baltic states, which is rubbish." Lavrov claimed that Georgia had breached an agreement not to resort to military force. During his phone talk with American president Bush, Russian president Dmitry Medvedev "stressed that the only way out of the tragic crisis provoked by the Georgian leadership is a withdrawal by Tbilisi of its armed formations from the conflict zone." President Dmitry Medvedev told Bush that Russia was "engaged in the task of forcing the Georgian side to accept peace, while defending the lives and property of its citizens, as is required under the Constitution and laws of the Russian Federation, and the legal standards of any civilized country." Medvedev claimed that Georgia's "barbaric actions" destroyed the lives of many people. A Russian official said, "We have not received through any channels any appeal from the Georgian leadership to the president of Russia." Deputy Foreign Minister Grigory Karasin said that Russia might request from the International Court of Justice and the European Court of Human Rights an investigation of Georgian war crimes, "I do not rule out that the Hague and Strasbourg courts and institutions in other cities will be involved in investigating these crimes, and this inhuman drama that has been played out." Karasin claimed that Russian peacekeepers "were killed by their own [Georgian] partners in the peacekeeping forces. [...] and all of a sudden, the Georgians, Georgian peacekeepers, begin shooting their Russian colleagues. This is, of course, a war crime." Russian Colonel General Anatoliy Nogovitsyn dismissed reports that Russian planes attacked civilian targets in Georgia, "We are not fighting peaceful towns, and are not conducting military strikes against civilians. We are only seeking to ensure peace." A Russian military official said that the S-200 air defense system was probably used by Georgia to shoot down a Russian Tupolev Tu-22 bomber, and alleged that Ukraine recently supplied the system to Georgia. Putin left the Olympic Games in Beijing. He visited the Russian city of Vladikavkaz on the evening of 9 August and met with the Generals, indicating that, instead of President Dmitry Medvedev, he controlled the military campaign. Putin stated that Russia would not pull back from Georgia, "There is almost no way we can imagine a return to the status quo." Putin accused Georgia of causing the "humanitarian catastrophe". He said that Russia still respected the Georgian people as "brotherly people". Putin said, "Georgia's aspiration to join NATO ... is driven by its attempt to drag other nations and peoples into its bloody adventures." Putin said in Vladikavkaz that Russia's actions were "absolutely justified and legitimate and more important, necessary." Vladimir Putin visited South Ossetian refugees in Alagir and commented on the story of alleged Georgian atrocities told by the Ossetian women, "They are completely mad. It's genocide." Dmitry Rogozin, Russian envoy to NATO, said that "98 percent of Tskhinvali" was devastated. He further stated, "Our troops have re-established control over the city." Sergei Lavrov said Georgia deserved the air strikes because Georgia had attacked civilians and Russian peacekeepers, and that yet more was to come: "Whatever side is used to bomb civilians and the positions of peacekeepers, this side is not safe, and they should know this". Lavrov said on the possibility of bombing of Tbilisi, "I don't think the bombing is coming from Tbilisi, but whatever part of Georgia is used for this aggression is not safe." Lavrov said that the United States was partially responsible for Georgian "aggression" because the United States had armed and trained Georgian military. Deputy Foreign Minister Grigory Karasin said by 9 August that Russia would consider the cessation of the hostilities "only if Georgia withdraws all armed forces from the conflict zone and signs a non-aggression pact with South Ossetia." According to an interview of Russian foreign minister Sergei Lavrov with the BBC, Lavrov had worked to gain support from US Secretary of State Condoleezza Rice, EU foreign policy head Javier Solana, and foreign ministers of France and Germany. Lavrov also claimed that 1,500 South Ossetian civilians and 15 Russian peacekeepers were casualties of the conflict. After the United Nations Security Council did not reach an agreement for the third day, Vitaly Churkin told journalists that 2,000 South Ossetian civilians were killed and 30,000 Ossetians had fled to Russia. Churkin claimed that "all the elements of genocide and war crimes" were in Georgia's military actions. Vitaly Churkin had said that Russia's only aim was "self-defense" at the Security Council meeting. He stated on 10 August, "Let's state clearly that we are ready to put an end to the war, that we will withdraw from South Ossetia, that we will sign an agreement on non-use of force." Sergey Lavrov told journalists on 10 August that Condoleezza Rice did not interpret his words on Saakashvili correctly and commented on Saakashvili as "a man who issued orders to commit war crimes" and "without the departure of Saakashvili, it is impossible to stop the conflict in South Ossetia." A Georgian official said on 10 August that Georgian troops were withdrawing from South Ossetia, and Russia confirmed the withdrawal. Dmitry Medvedev said that actions undertaken by Georgia "can't be described as anything other than genocide." Grigory Karasin called the termination of civilian air contact between Russia and Georgia "temporary." Anatoliy Nogovitsyn, Deputy Chief of the General Staff, said that Russian peacekeepers were in control of most of Tskhinvali. Nogovitsyn stated that "no official proposals" on the cessation of hostilities were sent by Georgia. Commenting on the Georgian announcement of the withdrawal from South Ossetia, Russian charge d'affairs in Washington Alexander Darchiev said that Georgian troops were "not withdrawing but regrouping, including heavy armor and increased attacks on Tskhinvali." He said, "Mass mobilization is still underway." Sergey Mitrokhin, chairman of the opposition Yabloko party, supported the Russian intervention in defense of South Ossetian civilians and said that the president of Russia had no other choice. However, he warned that the operation should not escalate into a full-scale war between Russia and Georgia and lead to conflict with the West. In response to Bush's statement, Lavrov claimed on 11 August that the removal of President Saakashvili from office was not among Russia's goals. However, Lavrov suggested Saakashvili's resignation because "he can no longer be our partner". On 11 August, Vladimir Putin declared, "The cold war has long ended but the mentality of the cold war has stayed firmly in the minds of several U.S. diplomats." Putin denounced America for transporting the Georgian servicemen from Iraq, "It is a shame that some of our partners are not helping us but, essentially, are hindering us. The very scale of this cynicism is astonishing -- the attempt to turn white into black, black into white, and to adeptly portray victims of aggression as aggressors and place the responsibility for the consequences of the aggression on the victims." Putin continued, "They, of course, had to hang Saddam Hussein for destroying several Shiite villages. But the current Georgian rulers who in one hour simply wiped 10 Ossetian villages from the face of the earth, the Georgian rulers which used tanks to run over children and the elderly, which threw civilians into cellars and burnt them -- they (Georgian leaders) are players that have to be protected." An anonymous American official said that the United States had notified Russia in advance of the return of Georgian soldiers from Iraq. Vladimir Putin said that the West had failed to hear the Russian warnings that "the Georgian side was preparing aggression," and the Russian "peacekeeping" operation would be continued until "its logical end". President Dmitry Medvedev also said that day that Russia now controlled Tskhinvali. Medvedev said, "We have never been and will never be passive observers in the region." Medvedev pledged that Russian military action would continue "to its logical conclusion". Medvedev discussed the situation in South Ossetia with the president of Finland. Russian ambassador to NATO Dmitry Rogozin stated that Georgian president Saakashvili "is no longer a man that we can deal with" and that he "must be punished for breaching international law. He is responsible for many war crimes." Russian envoy to NATO proposed an emergency Russia-NATO council meeting on 12 August. Deputy Prime Minister Sergei Ivanov told CNN that a "ceasefire agreement is signed by two sides when they meet," and that an agreement must be initially made between Georgia and its breakaway regions. Ivanov told CNN that Russia was continuing "to attack Georgian military targets" to "protect the lives of Russian citizens." Ivanov said that Georgian artillery near Gori was still attacking Tskhinvali. Ivanov said that Georgia wanted "to eliminate the population" of South Ossetia and the peace settlement would "never be a reality in the coming decades." The Russian Foreign Ministry stated that the position of the Baltic states and Poland could undermine their relations with Russia. On late 11 August, Russian UN envoy Vitaly Churkin did not support the proposed UN resolution calling for the cessation of hostilities endorsed by the Western powers because it had a "serious number" of issues; "I can't see us accepting this French draft of this resolution. We will look at the draft and try to bring it to a standard where it can play a role in this." After talks with Alexander Stubb, head of the OSCE, Russian foreign minister Sergei Lavrov said on 12 August: "It is not in our traditions to topple anyone or put someone on a throne." Lavrov said: "Saakashvili cannot be a partner and he must stand down." Lavrov said that the peace plan would not be accepted by Russia in case of Georgian participation in the new planned peacekeeping format and added, "They can no longer remain. They brought shame upon themselves as peacekeepers. They committed crimes." Lavrov also said the "only way" to end the war was Saakashvili's resignation, in addition to a complete Georgian retreat from South Ossetia. "It would be best if he left. I don't think Russia will feel like talking with Mr. Saakashvili after what he did to our citizens." Lavrov said: "The status quo in South Ossetia and Abkhazia is no longer possible." Russian officials accused the United States of encouraging Georgia's military action in South Ossetia. Vitaly Churkin said, "It is hard to imagine that Georgia could dare to launch its aggression against South Ossetia without a nod from abroad. We hate to think that the U.S. gave a green light for the assault." Later, Russian General Anatoliy Nogovitsyn said, "The invasion plan was rehearsed and perfected during Georgian-American war games in Georgia." Dmitry Rogozin said at a news conference on 12 August, "The issue is closed. There is no discussion (about Georgia's claim over South Ossetia). We are not going to see them anymore there." Rogozin called for Georgia to renounce the right to resort to military action. Rogozin also commented on the return of Georgian peacekeepers to South Ossetia, "They shot their brother Russian peacekeepers, then they finished them off with bayonets, so we are not going to see them there anymore." When the meeting with French president Sarkozy began, President Dmitry Medvedev announced, "I would like to inform you of a decision which I took a few hours ago. The operations which were carried out by a reinforced Russian peacekeeping brigade have ended because the goal that we set for ourselves has been achieved. The aggressor has been punished, and its armed forces are disorganized." After the meeting, Medvedev declared, "Before I talk about the results that we achieved today, I would like to emphasize that our meeting is taking place within a new status quo." Medvedev accused Saakashvili of lying about the observance of the ceasefire for 2 days and called Saakashvili a "lunatic" who had "smelled blood." Medvedev responded to the western calls for respecting the territorial integrity of Georgia by saying, "Ossetians and Abkhaz must respond to that question taking their history into account, including what happened in the past few days." He criticized the West for supporting Georgia, "International law should not permit the use of double standards." Sarkozy welcomed Medvedev's announcement of ending the Russian operation and said, "A ceasefire now has to take shape. We must draw up a rapid calendar so that each side can go back to the positions of before the crisis." The Georgian prime minister in Tbilisi reacted by saying, "We will need more evidence; everyone in this situation needs a signed, binding agreement. Until that happens, we are mobilised, we are prepared for everything." Anatoly Nogovitsyn said, "The peacekeeping measures being carried out now are meant to weaken the military potential of the aggressor to a level that will not allow him even to think about repeating his attempts to occupy." Russian Deputy Prime Minister Sergei Ivanov told the BBC, "We still have diplomatic relations with Georgia, we have millions of Georgian nationals who are Russian citizens and living happily in Russia. But we won't directly talk to Saakashvili, we won't do that. We offered him peace but not friendship." By 13 August, Russian foreign minister Sergey Lavrov declared, "We understand that this current Georgian leadership is a special project of the United States. But one day the United States will have to choose between defending its prestige over a virtual project or real partnership [with Russia]." Lavrov said, "Bush's speech said nothing of how Georgia was armed all these years, including by the United States. We have more than once warned our partners that this is a dangerous game. Mr Bush said nothing about what had happened on August 8, when Western leaders maintained silence when Tskhinvali became a target of massive bombing. The Western political elite got excited only after the Russian leadership decided not to leave its peacekeepers to their fate, not to allow... ethnic cleansing as it had happened in Srebrenica." Sergey Lavrov said on 13 August, "Georgia - of course, not Georgia, but the Georgian leadership - gave an order which led to an act of genocide, which resulted in war crimes, ethnic cleansing. And this, of course, cannot go unanswered." Lavrov said, "Upon the withdrawal of Georgian troops to their barracks, Russian troops will return to the territory of the Russian Federation. Our peacekeepers will remain in South Ossetia." Russian Defence Ministry officials said that the Russian warplanes were shot down by the Ukrainian military using the Ukrainian-supplied weaponry. Ukrainian authorities denied the allegation. Separatist leaders Sergei Bagapsh and Eduard Kokoity visited the Kremlin on 14 August to approve the EU-brokered peace plan. President Medvedev told Bagapsh and Kokoity, "I'd like you to know that we support any decision taken by the peoples of South Ossetia and Abkhazia. We will not only support them, but guarantee them in the Caucasus and in the whole world ... Right is on your side." Medvedev said that the UN charter and the Helsinki Act would be taken into consideration. Foreign Minister Lavrov ruled out "useless" preservation of Georgia's territorial integrity, which would be "a deeply human insult." Lavrov also stated that day that "it is impossible to persuade the Ossetians and Abkhaz to agree with the logic that they can be forced back into the Georgian state." He continued, "I can assure you that we don't want the collapse of Georgia, but the de facto situation is such that neither the South Ossetians nor the Abkhaz want to live in the same state with the person who has sent his troops against them." Colonel General Anatoliy Nogovitsyn said at a news conference, "We have information that American military transport aviation say they are delivering a certain humanitarian cargo to Tbilisi airport, though they said we had bombed the airport two days ago. Let's ask them will they invite you [the media] to check whether it is humanitarian or not?" He said about the cargo, "It is of major concern to Russians." Nogovitsyn's allegations were dismissed by Americans. Nogovitsyn called Ukrainian decree limiting Russian navy movements in the Ukrainian part of the Black Sea "nonsense". He also said, "we are just watching the situation. There are still snipers out there, certain groups have gotten through, and the provocations are continuing. We will settle things with everyone, and right now establishing peace is the main issue." The Russian Foreign Ministry stated that the future actions of the United States should not "lead to the repetition of a tragic scenario." On 15 August, the Russian Foreign Ministry stated that Medvedev would accept the ceasefire agreement. It was unknown whether the document had been modified. A Russian military official said that "there's absolutely no firing" in Georgia. He also said that humanitarian aid would be sent to Gori. Russia was waiting for Saakashvili to sign the ceasefire agreement. An anonymous official from the Russian Foreign Ministry said, "The time for conversations has passed. The time for concrete action has come." President Medvedev met with Angela Merkel, the Chancellor of Germany, in Sochi. Medvedev warned, "If our peacekeeping troops and our citizens are attacked, we will respond in the future in the same way that we have responded. Let there be no doubt about this." Medvedev said, "Russia, as guarantor of security in the Caucasus and the region, will make a decision that unambiguously supports the will of these two Caucasus peoples. Unfortunately, after what has happened, it is unlikely Ossetians and Abkhaz can live in one state with Georgians." Medvedev said, "We agreed with French President Sarkozy's main principles for resolving the conflict... These principles must be accepted by the Georgian side." Medvedev said, "Peace needs to re-established in the region and guaranteed and underpinned so that no one again will get idiotic ideas, and this I see as the main task of the Russian Federation." Medvedev further said, "We have the impression that Saakashvili is opposed to the diplomacy of the past 15 years." Medvedev said that Russia was not against better relations with the West. Medvedev responded to Merkel, "We are of course not against international peacekeepers... but the problem is that the Abkhazians and the Ossetians do not trust anyone except for Russian peacekeepers." Russian General Anatoliy Nogovitsyn said that Poland "is exposing itself to a strike" due to the placement of the American missile battery and that the nuclear weapons were allowed by the military doctrine of Russia "against the allies of countries having nuclear weapons if they in some way help them." The Russian General Staff said by August 15, "There is a presence of our armed forces near Gori and Senaki. We make no secret of it. They are there to defuse an enormous arsenal of weapons and military hardware which have been discovered in the vicinity of Gori and Senaki without any guard whatsoever." On 16 August, Sergey Lavrov said that the Georgian president had accepted a document which differed from the ceasefire agreement signed by the Russian and French presidents. Lavrov told the reporters that the Russian military would remain in Georgia and their withdrawal was linked with "extra security measures" for the Russian military in South Ossetia. Lavrov said on the duration of the departure of the troops, "As much as is needed." Lavrov continued, "This does not depend on us alone because we are constantly coming up against some problems on the Georgian side. Everything depends on how effectively and quickly these problems are solved." Medvedev signed the ceasefire agreement negotiated by Sarkozy in Sochi. Anatoliy Nogovitsyn commented on the bridges destroyed in Georgia that they "were the objects we tackled", but denied the reports of Russia continuing military action against Georgia as "a hoax", further stating that "Our work is devoted to peacekeeping problems." Russian Foreign Ministry spokesman Andrei Nesterenko said the Russian military would leave Georgia upon "completing security operations" to remove Georgian military ammunition and mines. Nogovitsyn said that Russian troops were preparing to withdraw from Georgia. According to the Kremlin, Medvedev told Sarkozy on 17 August that Russian military "from tomorrow ... will begin withdrawing". On 17 August, Anatoly Nogovitsyn commented on the Russian takeover of Enguri Dam that "strategic facilities of this kind could be targeted in provocations and even terror attacks." In several hours after Nogovitsyn's statement, Medvedev announced that Russian forces would begin to pull out of Georgia the following day. Medvedev said that Georgian troops must withdraw to their permanent locations. Major General Vyacheslav Borisov said near Gori on the morning of 17 August that "planned withdrawal" endorsed by Medvedev had started. However, a spokesman for the Russian defence ministry soon stated that the pullout had not yet started. Chairman of foreign affairs committee in the Russian parliament, Konstantin Kosachev, commented on the withdrawal of the Russian troops on 17 August that it would happen "sooner or later", "But how much time it will take, it depends, definitely, on how Georgians will continue to behave." The Russian Foreign Ministry called the statement of South Ossetian president Eduard Kokoity on the eviction of Georgians from South Ossetia "an emotional statement made under the influence of the situation resulting from the massive armed attack organized by the Georgian leadership against South Ossetia." On 18 August, Medvedev commented on the Georgian military action, "We shall do our best to not let this crime go unpunished." He promised that attackers on the Russian citizens would "face a crushing response", by declaring in Kursk, "If someone thinks they can kill our citizens, kill soldiers and officers fulfilling the role of peacekeepers, we will never allow this." Russian ambassador to NATO, Dmitry Rogozin, said he would no longer request an extraordinary meeting of the Russia-NATO Council. "We do not consider it possible to wait anymore for 'emergency assistance' that has failed to arrive for a week now." He said that the United States was responsible for the meeting not being held because Americans were afraid of questions: "The American delegation did not even show up at a Preparatory Committee meeting." On 19 August, Colonel General Anatoliy Nogovitsyn told the Interfax-AVN agency, "We will not leave a single barrel, a single cartridge for Georgia, which initiated this bloodshed. Part of these arsenals, especially ammunition, will be destroyed and are already being destroyed. And as for the rest of the war trophies, we will use them as we please, in particular will take for ourselves part of the tanks and other armored vehicles that are in good condition." Russian foreign minister Sergey Lavrov commented on NATO's "biased" demands to withdraw Russian troops from Georgia, "They blame us as if there were no requirements for the Georgian side in the six points. I mean the requirements to bring back their troops to the places where they are on a permanent basis." Sergey Lavrov said NATO was "trying to make a victim of the aggressor, to absolve of guilt a criminal regime, to save a collapsed regime, and is taking a course to rearm the current leaders of Georgia." The Abkhaz parliament debated the issue of recognition on 20 August and would ask Russia for recognition. Speaker of the upper chamber of the Russian parliament, Sergey Mironov, said that Russia would revise the status of the breakaway regions, "We have repeatedly heard the declarations of these peoples, and we know the results of several referendums in South Ossetia." Russian representative to the UN, Vitaly Churkin, refused to accept a proposal for a Security Council resolution supporting Georgia's territorial integrity, citing a "completely different, more complex situation" that had emerged. Russia-NATO cooperation was frozen by August 21. On 22 August, Anatoliy Nogovitsyn commented on Bush's statement regarding the Russian withdrawal, saying that the US president's secretary had to follow the Russian press conferences more closely. On 25 August, the Russian State Duma discussed the status of Abkhazia and South Ossetia. Boris Gryzlov, speaker of the Duma, claimed Georgia's military action in South Ossetia resembled the Nazi attack on the Soviet Union. The presidents of Abkhazia and South Ossetia addressed the Russian parliament. They said that they would not return to Georgia and urged Russian president Medvedev to recognize their independence. President Medvedev said that Russia could counter the threats from NATO, and Prime Minister Vladimir Putin said Russia could cancel some trade agreements necessary for acceding to the World Trade Organization (WTO). Sergey Mironov, the Federation Council speaker, said that both Abkhazia and South Ossetia showed all the signs of statehood. Members of the State Duma, Vladislav Reznik and Yevgeny Alexeyevich Fyodorov, dismissed the US threats of economic isolation of Russia over its actions in Georgia. A Russian diplomat negotiating Russia's WTO accession threatened to hit back at the US if the US did not support Russia's WTO membership. On 26 August, President Medvedev said, "We're not afraid of anything [including] the prospect of a Cold War. Of course, we don't need that . . . Everything depends on the stance of our partners and the world community and our partners in the West." Medvedev commented on the aftermath of the recognition of Abkhazia and South Ossetia, "If they want to preserve good relations with Russia, they will understand the reason for taking such a decision, and the situation will be calm." He claimed that "a peaceful solution to the conflict was not in Tbilisi's plans. The Georgian leadership methodically planned for war. Saakashvili chose genocide to achieve his political ends." CNN asked Medvedev whether he would send Russian troops to other post-Soviet states, and Medvedev responded, "As to interfering in other areas, in other conflicts, of course, we have no plans for such interference, and we will not do so. But Russia is an independent sovereign state, and it has the right to decide what it has to do to promote its interests, particularly in the areas along its borders." Medvedev told Al Jazeera, "Russia does need good relations with the West – this is without any doubt. And the West needs good relations with Russia." Medvedev declared in a letter to the Financial Times, "This was not a war of our choice. We have no designs on Georgian territory." American military aircraft and sea vessels were ostensibly bringing humanitarian assistance to Georgia to send a signal to Russia that it could not behave as it wished. President Medvedev told the BBC, "What the Americans call humanitarian cargoes — of course, they are bringing in weapons. We're not trying to prevent it." However, such allegations were rejected by Americans. On 27 August, the deputy chief of the Russian General Staff said that Russia was upholding a 1997 treaty with Ukraine regarding the Sevastopol naval base. He accused NATO of "ratcheting up tension" in the Black Sea. "Now we have people flexing their muscles, demonstrating force ... We can only regret that." Russians expressed their concerns that there were more NATO ships than Russian ships in the Black Sea. The deputy chief of the Russian General Staff, Anatoliy Nogovitsyn, described at a briefing the limitations of naval entry and presence in the Black Sea set by Montreux Convention Regarding the Regime of the Straits, adding, "The convention stipulates a limited number of vessels. That is, the same state cannot deploy a certain group without any limit." Russian agriculture minister, Alexey Gordeyev, said that poultry and pork imports to Russia would be reduced. Russian foreign minister Sergey Lavrov said in Dushanbe that Russia would withdraw from Georgia after international monitoring would have been established, "We will be ready to make decisions, including in the United Nations...on additional increases in the number of international monitors, clarifying their mandate and possibly other steps with international participation." Spokesman for Vladimir Putin, Dmitry Peskov, commented on the international support of Russia's recognition of Abkhazia and South Ossetia, "To initiate wide support (for recognition) is not a primary goal. We're not going to twist anyone's hands to make them support (recognition)." On 28 August, Putin told CNN that the war was tragic, "For us, it is a special tragedy, because [...] the Georgian people being a nation of ancient culture -- became, without a doubt, a part of the multinational culture of Russia" and "for us, there is even a tinge of a civil war". He continued, "We have never infringed on the sovereignty of Georgia and have no intention of doing so in the future." When Putin was asked whether Russia would attack other post-Soviet states, he objected, "We have not attacked anyone. [...] We have no intention of attacking anyone, and we have no intention of going to war with anyone." Putin remembered his meeting with U.S. president George W. Bush during the Olympics. Putin accused U.S. president George W. Bush of staging the war in Georgia to get the Republican Party's 2008 U.S. presidential candidate Senator John McCain into the White House. Putin said, "It is not just that the American side could not restrain the Georgian leadership from this criminal act. The American side, in effect, armed and trained the Georgian army." Putin further said, "Why spend years holding difficult negotiations and looking for complicated compromises in ethnic conflicts? It's easier to arm one of the parties and push it to kill the other party, and the job is done." Putin said, "U.S. citizens were indeed in the area in conflict. They were acting in implementing those orders doing as they were ordered, and the only one who can give such orders is their leader." Putin responded to journalists that Russia was forced to attack Georgia in response to the death of the Russian peacekeepers. Putin said that the Russians tested the poultry products and that 19 American companies would no longer be able to import to Russia, while 29 other companies were given time to upgrade their safety standards. However, Putin claimed the embargo was not linked to the war in Georgia. Colonel-General Anatoliy Nogovitsyn said that the Russian military discovered a passport belonging to an inhabitant of Texas fighting among Georgian special troops. President Medvedev asked the Shanghai Cooperation Organisation for the support, which would be a "serious signal for those who are trying to justify the aggression." However, the declaration calling for the peaceful solution of the conflict and "preserving the unity of a state and its territorial integrity" was adopted by the summit. Sergei Lavrov commented in Dushanbe on the possibility of sanctions being imposed on Russia, "My friend Kouchner also said that we will soon attack Moldova and Ukraine and the Crimea ... But that is a sick imagination, and probably that applies to sanctions as well. I think it is a demonstration of complete confusion." The Kremlin released a statement reporting that there had been an earlier phone conversation between Medvedev and French president Sarkozy for about an hour. The statement said, "The Russian side has stressed the need for Tbilisi to carry out point four of the Medvedev-Sarkozy plan, under which all Georgian troops should be returned to their original bases." The statement further said, "Mr Medvedev and Mr Sarkozy also discussed additional agreements, which may in future ensure safety in the areas near the borders of South Ossetia and Abkhazia." Sergei Lavrov said that German Chancellor Angela Merkel had not condemned Russia's recognition of Georgia's separatist regions and its failure to withdraw from Georgia during a "constructive" phone conversation with Medvedev a day earlier. Putin met with Russian journalists in Sochi on 29 August and reportedly downplayed the severity of the Western reactions. He reportedly said on the Sochi Olympics, "Let them cancel it: we'll build one stadium instead of two;" Putin reportedly stated on energy deals, "We'll sell Central Asian gas to those who want it, including Asia;" Putin reportedly commented on Russia's relations with the West, "Don't worry, European leaders tell me that everything will be normal." Putin stressed that Russia could manage without the West: "They cannot intimidate us." On 29–30 August, President Medvedev held a phone conversation with British prime minister Gordon Brown. Medvedev, in a statement, asked for the deployment of European monitors to Georgia to observe "the acts of the Georgian government." Vladimir Putin called on the European Union not to pay attention to proposals to hold Russia accountable for the war. On 31 August, President Medvedev said that the recognition of Abkhazia and South Ossetia was irreversible and threatened retribution against any possible EU sanctions. Medvedev said, "The absolute priority for us is the defense of the life and dignity of our citizens, no matter where they are located. [...] And everyone should understand that if someone launches an aggressive sortie, then he will receive a response." Vladimir Chizhov, Russian envoy to the EU, said that sanctions were "highly improbable". Russian ambassador to the UK Yuri Fedotov said that Russia did not want confrontation with the West and "any sanctions [would] hurt the European Union first of all much more than Russia." Fedotov also said, "Russia wants to be an equal partner... but the partnership should not be the kind of partnership between the horseman and horse, but of two equal individuals." By early September, Vladimir Putin promised retribution against the NATO ships in the Black Sea. However, he did not specify the details of the retribution. Russia imposed trade sanctions on the West in apparent retaliation for the West's pro-Georgian stance. Putin also reached agreements with Uzbekistan and Turkmenistan, threatening the viability of the Nabucco pipeline. On 3 September, Yuri Fedotov, the Russian ambassador to the UK, stated that Russian forces would leave the "buffer zone" only when international peacekeepers were deployed in Georgia, and the Georgian government had accepted the treaty on the non-use of force against South Ossetia and Abkhazia. Fedotov "deplored" the anti-Russian stance of the British prime minister and the British Foreign Secretary. He claimed to have communicated with the Foreign Office about the tensions before August 7 and that he was told that Saakashvili was "under control". However, Fedotov's story was denied by the Foreign Office. President Medvedev stated at the Kremlin that "Russia is a state that has to be reckoned with from now on" and that the "world changed". On 7 September 2008, Yury Luzhkov, Mayor of Moscow, said that Georgia and the United States should learn from the "crushing" defeat of Nazi Germany by Russia, "Let that be a stern and appropriate reminder to those who surround Russia with their missiles and bases." Luzhkov further said, "Let it be a warning to Saakashvili's regime." On 11 September, Vladimir Putin held a three-hour meeting with journalists. He said he met with US president Bush twice during the Olympics. During their first meeting, Bush said, "No one wants war." After their second meeting in Beijing, Putin "had the feeling" that Bush "wouldn't do anything about stopping the conflict." Putin accused the US of the conflict, "They sent instructors who helped to mobilise the Georgian forces. Of course, we had to respond." Putin warned Russia would retaliate against the installation of US missiles in Poland by targeting Poland. Putin said that the majority of Ukrainians didn't want NATO membership. Putin claimed that Medvedev was in charge, "I am sorry it was his lot to have to deal with this crisis. [...] He had to give the order to send troops to these republics [South Ossetia and Abkhazia]. He had to recognise these republics; he couldn't do otherwise. These were his decisions." Putin said that Russia didn't intend to attack Tbilisi during the war. Putin denied that the war with Georgia was responsible for the crisis of the Russian financial markets. Putin said that he had discussed the recognition of Abkhazia and South Ossetia with Chinese officials on 8 August 2008. Putin also said that Russia had no "imperial ambitions", otherwise the Soviet Union "would still exist today". The Russian Foreign Ministry stated that the Ukrainian position on the war "cannot be seen as anything other than unfriendly towards Russia". On 12 September, Dmitry Medvedev said, "For Russia, August 8 was like September 11 for the United States. I would like to see major lessons from it for the world." Medvedev recounted the August 8 contact between him and George Bush. Medvedev claimed Georgian president Saakashvili was a drug addict and was "burdened with a host of pathologies". Medvedev said that Russian recognition of Abkhazia and South Ossetia was necessary to prevent Georgian attack, "If he takes this blood once he would try again if he was not muzzled." Medvedev accused Condoleezza Rice of encouraging Saakashvili, "Rice met him and the boy changed miraculously afterwards. He started to postpone the agreement. He started preparations for war." Medvedev said that Georgia getting the NATO MAP would not have deterred Russia, "I can assure you that as president I would not have wavered for a second to make the same decisions that I made back then." Medvedev commented on the Russia-West relations, "I don't think this phase of confrontation will be lengthy." Medvedev asserted that Russia did not intend to annex South Ossetia. He voiced his displeasure over NATO's ties with Ukraine and Georgia because "there is a major risk of separatism". On 15 September, Russian president Medvedev said that the isolation of Russian business from international markets was a positive development. He commented on Russia's application for membership in the World Trade Organization, which Georgia was blocking, saying that "WTO is not a carrot." Medvedev said that Russia was not some "banana republic" which could be affected by sanctions. On 18 September, Medvedev said during a meeting with the new ambassadors to Russia that relations with the USA were important for Russia. He said that it was not worthy to quarrel over "small things". He said that Georgia's "aggression" was a "challenge" to the international community. The next day, Medvedev announced that Russia was no longer going to live behind the "iron curtain" instead of cooperating with other international players. On 20 September, Russian Deputy Foreign Minister Alexander Grushko commented on Condoleezza Rice's speech at the Marshall Fund that Russia did not want to engage in anti-Americanism and self-isolation. By late September, Russia had increased cooperation with Venezuela in retaliation to the US backing of Georgia. On 6 November 2008, President Medvedev expressed his wish that the August war would not "have any effect on Russia's relations with the European Union" and said that "this page needs to be turned over." French president Sarkozy reportedly convinced Vladimir Putin on 12 August not to follow through with his plans to depose the Georgian government and "hang Saakashvili by the balls". The details of this conversation between Putin and Sarkozy were made public by Sarkozy's team in November 2008 to support claims that French involvement prevented Georgia's fall. British journalist Luke Harding wrote in November 2008 that Saakashvili making fun of Putin as "Liliputin" before the war had probably caused Putin's desire to hang him. Dmitry Peskov, Press-Secretary of Putin, denied that Putin had threatened Saakashvili's balls. On 19 December 2008, Sergey Lavrov declared that the resumption of Russia-NATO dialogue must begin with the discussion of the Georgian "aggression". Lavrov said on 23 December that the United States had promised Russia that NATO would never accept Georgia if the latter used force in South Ossetia and accused the US of reneging on this promise.
Saudi Arabia	According to Russian sources, Bandar bin Sultan told Putin in September 2008 that King Abdullah and the whole leadership of the country fully understood the actions of the Russian side in South Ossetia.
Serbia	Oliver Ivanović, Serbian State Secretary of the Ministry for Kosovo and Metohija, stated on August 11, "The question of Kosovo was didactic and inspirational for South Ossetia, so that they wanted to further strain the relations and define their position, which is understandable. Georgia has tried to solve the issue by using violence just as Serbia tried to do it in 1999." Countries that accept "the violation of the international law and disregard of the sovereignty of states, as it was done in the case of Kosovo, they can expect the possibility that such a recipe will be applied in all other situations". Serbian foreign minister Vuk Jeremić said on August 14 that Kosovo "set a dangerous precedent for the solution of problems all over the world" and "the conflict in the Caucasus has shown the dangers of the militaristic approach to problem solving." On 24 September 2008, Foreign Minister Jeremic said that Serbia would not recognize Abkhazia and South Ossetia.
Slovakia	Slovakia's prime minister Robert Fico claimed on August 13 that Georgia was guilty for the war and dismissed "such a black and white perception, according to which one side is good, and the others are bad." He called for a ceasefire.
Spain	Miguel Ángel Moratinos, Minister for Foreign Affairs, stated by August 9 that it is "regrettable" that the conflict in South Ossetia erupted "during the Olympic truce". On August 13, he called on the EU to send a message to both sides to start the "political and diplomatic dialogue".
Sweden	Swedish Minister for Foreign Affairs Carl Bildt said on August 8 that the crisis was due to provocations from the South Ossetian side and that Georgian forces were trying to restore the constitutional order. Bildt further stated, "It is extremely important that all those involved show restraint and play their part in bringing about a political solution." On 9 August, Bildt compared Russia's reason for going to war with Georgia to Adolf Hitler's actions, "No state has the right to intervene militarily in the territory of another state simply because there are individuals there with a passport issued by that state or who are nationals of the state. Attempts to apply such a doctrine have plunged Europe into war in the past... And we have reason to remember how Hitler used this very doctrine little more than half a century ago to undermine and attack substantial parts of central Europe". Bildt stated that there could be a meeting of EU foreign ministers in Paris on 11 August. Bildt told the BBC that non-rejection of Russia's claimed right to intervene in other countries could have "devastating consequences." On 18 August, Prime Minister Fredrik Reinfeldt halted all exercises and military ties between Sweden and Russia, saying that "the Russian invasion of Georgia is unacceptable and a violation of international law. The Russian action has changed the image of Russia as an international player." Following the Russian recognition of South Ossetia, Bildt warned that Russia opened Pandora's box, impacting Russia itself, and said, "South Ossetian independence is a joke. We are talking about a smugglers' paradise of 60,000 people financed by the Russian security services. No one can seriously consider that as an independent state." He also said that Saakashvili had only "made a tactical blunder that turned into a strategic disaster". In early September 2008, the Swedish defense minister said that Sweden would revise its military doctrine due to the war in Georgia. It emerged by October 2008 that the Russian officials were refusing to meet with Carl Bildt due to his stance on Russia. In 2010, WikiLeaks revealed that Sweden wanted to expel Russia from the Council of Europe before November 2008.
Syria	Syrian president Bashar al-Assad during his visit to Russia on August 20 accused the United States of using "double standards" concerning Abkhazia and South Ossetia, stating that the West "is ignoring for some reason the rights of the people of Abkhazia and South Ossetia." Assad added: "In a situation when Georgia started the war, the position of Russia [...] was absolutely right."
Turkey	Prime Minister Recep Tayyip Erdoğan said on August 8 that Turkey was alarmed by the conflict. Erdoğan called for "an immediate cease-fire and recourse to diplomacy". Later on that day, Turkey approved the Georgian application for 30-40 MW of electricity. On 13 August, the president of Turkey, Abdullah Gül, spoke by phone with Russian president Medvedev and endorsed Russia's decisions. Gül said that Turkey was ready to help resolve the conflict. Recep Tayyip Erdoğan met Russian president Dmitry Medvedev near Moscow on 13 August. Erdogan also met with Putin and declared that Turkey was ready to help Russia in the settlement of the conflict. Putin responded that Turkey was a "reliable" partner and "good neighbor" of Russia. Erdogan then visited Georgia and supported Georgia's territorial integrity. Georgian president Saakashvili said that Turkey had promised to aid in the reconstruction of Gori, Georgia. On 15 August 2008, it emerged that Turkey was not granting passage to American ships delivering humanitarian assistance for Georgia. In 2010, WikiLeaks revealed that Turkey was going to retaliate militarily against Russia if the latter would invade the Georgian region Adjara.
Ukraine	On 4 August 2008, the Ukrainian Defense Ministry rejected South Ossetian allegations that Ukraine had trained Georgian snipers responsible for attacking Tskhinvali. Ukrainian Defense Minister Yuriy Yekhanurov said that Ukrainian arms supplies to Georgia was legal since there was no international embargo against Georgia. On 5 August, the Ministry of Foreign Affairs of Ukraine expressed its concern over recent incidents in the South Ossetian conflict zone and that the start of the conflict demonstrated ineffectiveness of the existing (Russian-dominated) peacekeeping format. Andriy Parubiy, member of the Verkhovna Rada from the Our Ukraine–People's Self-Defense Bloc, suggested that Russian peacekeepers were occupying forces and therefore must be replaced with the GUAM troops. On 8 August, the Ministry of Foreign Affairs called on all sides to immediately cease fire and begin resolving the issue through negotiations. Ukraine confirmed its position of support for Georgian territorial integrity and sovereignty. Ukraine said on August 8 that Russia was "gradually becoming a side of the conflict." The Foreign Ministry urged Russia to remove its military from Georgia and pressure the South Ossetian separatists to negotiate. President Viktor Yushchenko sent deputy Foreign Minister Konstantin Eliseev to Tbilisi on 8 August. Eliseev visited Gori, Georgia on 9 August and declared that Ukraine was ready to provide humanitarian and political assistance to Georgia. Valeriy Pysarenko, member of Yulia Tymoshenko Bloc, stated that Ukraine's two brotherly peoples were clashing in the war. Acting foreign minister of Ukraine Volodymyr Khandohiy asked Russia not to intervene in the conflict in the Caucasus and become a party to the war. On 9 August, Ukrainian nationalist organization Tryzub, headed by Dmytro Yarosh, issued a statement saying that Georgian response to the South Ossetian provocation was legal. The statement also said: "Ukraine has already been indirectly involved in this military conflict. The latest statements of the Ministry of Foreign Affairs of Russia and Russian statesmen and politicians (Dugin, Zyuganov, Luzhkov, Zatulin, etc) regarding our state and its integral part - the Crimean Peninsula - testify to exactly this." President Yushchenko authorized humanitarian assistance to the civilian population of Georgia. Ukrainian foreign minister Volodymyr Ohryzko arrived in Tbilisi. The Ukrainian Foreign Ministry announced it was ready to evacuate Ukrainian citizens from Georgia. Ukraine stated on August 10 that it could prohibit Russian warships to return to their base in the Ukrainian city of Sevastopol. President Yushchenko decreed that the Russian Black Sea Fleet must notify Ukraine 72 hours before its movement. Yuschhenko suggested that the contract between Ukraine and Russia regarding the Sevastopol naval base would not be extended in 2017. RIA Novosti reported that Yushchenko decreed to check the financial operations of the Russian fleet and utility payments. However, Yushchenko rejected this report. On 11 August, Oles Doniy, deputy from the Our Ukraine–People's Self-Defense Bloc, said that the foreign military detachments had to leave Crimea to avert the repetition of the Ossetian scenario in Crimea. Ukrainian foreign minister Ohryzko said that Turkey had closed its airspace to the Ukrainian plane carrying humanitarian aid to Georgia. The Foreign Ministry stated that no Ukrainian military servicemen, except two UN observers, were present in Georgia. UNA-UNSO announced that Ukrainian volunteers were ready to go to Georgia. On 12 August, Ukraine air-shipped 30 tons of humanitarian aid to Georgia. Ukrainian diplomats in Tbilisi were evacuated to Yerevan. Ukrainian citizens and soldiers, who had participated in the exercises, were also evacuated from Georgia. President Yushchenko declared in Simferopol that the deployment of the Russian Black Sea fleet in the conflict was dangerous, as it could draw Ukraine into international conflicts. Yushchenko visited Tbilisi on 12 August and gave a speech. He spoke in support of Georgia's aspiration to freedom and independence. He stated, "We came here to prove your sovereignty, territorial integrity, and independence. These are our values. [...] You never be alone." On 13 August, the Deputy Chief of Staff to the president of Ukraine, Andrii Goncharuk, said that Yushchenko's visit to Tbilisi, along with 4 European leaders, demonstrated Ukraine's contribution to international efforts to achieve a cessation of hostilities. He also said that the ceasefire agreement negotiated by Sarkozy mostly consisted of Ukraine's proposals. Prime Minister Yulia Tymoshenko stated, "We stand in solidarity with the democratically-elected leadership of Georgia. Georgia's sovereignty and territorial integrity must be respected". Ukrainian Vice Prime Minister Hryhoriy Nemyria arrived in Georgia. Deputy Head of the Presidential Secretariat Oleksandr Shlapak declared that Ukraine was not going to change the terms of the deployment of the Russian Black Sea fleet. MP Andriy Parubiy stated that Ukraine could be Russia's next target and that support for Georgia was important to Ukraine's national security. He said that Russia could use the South Ossetian scenario in Crimea. Ukrainian Defense Ministry called media reports on Ukrainian military participation in the conflict a "lie". Igor Kril, leader of the United Centre party, said that Ukraine would be the next target of "imperial" Russia after Georgia. Kril criticized Prime Minister Yulia Tymoshenko for vacationing in the Mediterranean Sea and not making any statement on Georgia. On 14 August, President Yushchenko discussed the situation in Georgia with US president George W. Bush on phone. Bush thanked Yushchenko for helping to broker the ceasefire. On 14 August, Yuriy Kostenko, leader of the Ukrainian People's Party proposed to dissolve the Commonwealth of Independent States (CIS) because the union did not prevent military conflict between its members and it was "a remnant of the Russian imperial blanket". On 17 August, President Yushchenko criticized the CIS and said that the war in Georgia was the "first war in the framework of the CIS". First president Leonid Kravchuk said by 15 August that Ukraine's attempt to bar the Russian fleet from returning to Sevastopol could lead to war with Russia. On 15 August, President Yushchenko yielded his state dacha in Crimea to Sandra Roelofs, First Lady of Georgia, and two sons of Georgian president Saakashvili. President Yushchenko criticized Russia: "A peacekeeper who started shooting at civilians is not trustworthy." Yushchenko announced that Ukraine was ready to deploy its peacekeeping contingent to Georgia. On 16 August, Ukraine announced it was proposing to Europe to use missile early warning systems in Ukraine in an attempt to ensure collective security for Ukraine because Russia had canceled a 1992 agreement on radar systems with Ukraine. Ukrainian journalists and experts suspected that pro-Russian Crimea would become a cause for military intervention by Russia. Ukrainian Rada member Mustafa Dzhemilev proposed to close the Russian consulates in Crimea to avert the repetition of the South Ossetian scenario. President Viktor Yushchenko's aide said on 18 August that they had "now confirmed" that Prime Minister Yulia Tymoshenko was attempting to win Russia's backing for her presidential candidacy by remaining silent on the Russian invasion of Georgia. Tymoshenko denied the allegations on 20 August. The General Staff of the Ukrainian Armed Forces was studying the war and possible implications for Ukraine. On 21 August 2008, Mustafa Dzhemilev declared that Georgia had the right to bomb Crimea because the Russian fleet was based there. As of 22 August 2008, 5 Ukrainian aircraft had delivered 156 tonnes of humanitarian supplies, worth $8 million. On 23 August 2008, President Yushchenko said that NATO had to respond to the Russian invasion of Georgia by accepting Ukraine as the alliance's member because "When the borders of NATO expand, so too does the region of peace and stability." Yushchenko also said that Ukraine would increase its defense spending in response to the war in Georgia. On 25 August 2008, Dmytro Yarosh said that the invasion of Georgia was a continuation of the military expansion of the resurrected Muscovite empire, and the United States was actually defending the transport corridor in Georgia. He said that information about Russia's preparations for a war with Georgia had been known for the past year, and the actual start of the invasion was not a surprise to Ukrainian nationalists. He added that Russia would continue the war in Ukraine, either in Luhansk Oblast or Crimea. Viktor Yanukovych, the leader of the Party of Regions, stated on 26 August that Ukraine should recognise the independence of South Ossetia and Abkhazia. He stated that the situation should be treated like Kosovo. The Communist Party also registered a draft resolution to recognise the two republics. After he was elected president, Yanukovych said on 3 June 2010: "I have never recognized Abkhazia, South Ossetia, or Kosovo's independence. This is a violation of international law." President Yushchenko condemned the Russian recognition of Abkhazia and South Ossetia: "We are sorry about this decision, for Ukraine it is unacceptable, and therefore we cannot support this position." Ukrainian president Viktor Yushchenko said that he intended to increase the rent for the Russian naval base at Sevastopol in the Crimea. The Ukrainian Foreign Ministry cancelled a visit of the Ukrainian delegation to Russia in response to the Russian recognition of Abkhazia and South Ossetia. President Yushchenko organized a vacation for the Georgians in Crimea. On 2 September 2008, the Ukrainian Rada of the 6th convocation held its first post-vacation session, which lasted 8 hours and focused on the August 2008 conflict. Still, none of the around 10 proposed resolutions were passed. Far more deputies supported pro-Russian proposals, such as condemnation of Georgia's military action and recognition of South Ossetia's independence, than pro-Georgian ones, and the Party of Regions led the pro-Russian side. In early September 2008, Yushchenko warned that he would dismiss Verkhovna Rada and appoint new elections. Tymoshenko claimed that Yushchenko's "fight" for reelection was to blame and that her position on Georgia was "in line with the EU position, and is not to drag Ukraine into any conflicts." Supporters of Viktor Yushchenko declared that they would continue cooperation with the Yulia Tymoshenko Bloc if the latter supported a pro-Georgian resolution on the war. However, Tymoshenko's fraction leader Ivan Kyrylenko insisted that Georgia was the "aggressor". On 4 September 2008, People's Deputy of Ukraine Iryna Herashchenko said that the Russian recognition of South Ossetia was a time bomb for Russia because the Parade of sovereignties in Russia was temporarily paused. She noted that only 4 entities recognized South Ossetia's independence: Hamas, Hezbollah, the Party of Regions and Russia. On 5 September 2008, Foreign Minister Volodymyr Ohryzko accused Russia of distributing Russian passports to the residents of Crimea, which could be used as a justification for military intervention. In late September 2008, Ohryzko discussed the war in Georgia with his Russian counterpart Sergey Lavrov in New York. Ohryzko told Lavrov that Ukraine would not recognize Abkhazia and South Ossetia. On 8 September 2008, Yulia Tymoshenko proposed to change Ukraine's policies regarding Crimea to avert the repetition of the "Georgian scenario". On 17 September 2008, the Parliament of Crimea adopted a declaration demanding that the Verkhovna Rada of Ukraine recognize the independence of Abkhazia and South Ossetia. On 22 September 2008, Ukrainian nationalist politician Stepan Khmara declared that the Russian aggression against Georgia would trigger the disintegration of Russia like the war in Afghanistan caused the Dissolution of the Soviet Union. On 24 September 2008, President Yushchenko criticized Russia for violating the international law in Georgia at the UN General Assembly session. On 25 September 2008, the Security Service of Ukraine announced that they had arrested several persons in August–September 2008 who had been attempting to recruit Ukrainian citizens with military background for fighting on the side of Abkhazia. In early October 2008, Valeriy Konovalyuk, chairman of the commission on Georgia in the Ukrainian parliament, stated that Ukraine supplied "aggressor" Georgia with the tanks, helicopters, artillery, and Buk missile system at artificially low prices in detriment to the national defense capabilities of Ukraine. Yulia Tymoshenko said that Yushchenko was responsible for foreign arms export, and the Ukrainian government had no control. On 22 October, the Security Service of Ukraine stated that arms export to Georgia was legal and launched an investigation against Konovalyuk for disclosing documents containing state secrets. On 3 November 2008, the Konovalyuk Commission visited Tskhinvali to investigate Ukrainian arms supplies to Georgia. Valery Konovalyuk declared that the Ukrainian people were inclined "to strengthen our fraternal relations with the peoples of the Russian Federation, which is why we are here." On 14 November, Konovalyuk claimed that Ukraine continued to supply tanks to Georgia and was using American planes for their transportation. Konovalyuk was summoned to the US embassy. On 17 November, the Security Service of Ukraine finished an investigation into Ukrainian arms supplies to Georgia and found no violations of national and international laws. The Security Service stated that Konovalyuk's assertions were harming Ukraine's national interests. Ukrainian defense minister Yuriy Yekhanurov said on 3 December that Konovaluyk was spreading disinformation because Russia had a kompromat on him. Konovalyuk suggested on 19 December that materials collected by the commission could be used to impeach Yushchenko. On 2 October 2008, Vasyl Volha, leader of Union of Left Forces, said that Crimea was ready to secede from Ukraine in response to President Yushchenko's pro-Georgian stance. In late October 2008, the Ukrainian Foreign Ministry stated that Russia had armed Abkhazia in violation of international law. Chairman of the department of Military Security of the National Security and Defense Council of Ukraine said that the UN Security Council had discussed the arms trade with Georgia, but did not rule that Georgia did not have the right to purchase the foreign weaponry. Chairman of Ukrspecexport Serhii Bondarchuk stated that there was no UN embargo against Georgia. Bondarchuk further said that arms supplies to Abkhazia and South Ossetia were prohibited, and Russia supplied 23 BM-21 Grad systems to South Ossetia in violation of this prohibition. On 26 November 2008, Ukrainian defense minister Yuriy Yekhanurov announced that additional troops would be deployed for the defense of Ukraine's southern and eastern borders in 2009 in response to the war in the Caucasus. In December 2008, the director of the Foreign Policy Institute of the Diplomatic Academy under the Ministry of Foreign Affairs of Ukraine, Hryhoriy Perepelitsa, said that if Ukraine did not take measures to ensure the withdrawal of the Russian fleet from Crimea, the Georgian scenario would be repeated in Ukraine in 2017. Perepelitsa said in March 2009 that other participants of GUAM - Azerbaijan and Moldova - did not support Georgia in the same way as Ukraine did. In February 2009, Ukrainian foreign minister Volodymyr Ohryzko and his deputy, Konstantin Eliseyev, were awarded the Order of Honor of Georgia for their support for Georgia in August 2008. In August 2009, Ukrainian president Viktor Yushchenko responded to the letter from Russian president Dmitry Medvedev and defended Ukraine's stance on Georgia as aligned with the international position. Yushchenko called Medvedev's allegations of Ukrainian arms supplies to Georgia "unfounded", because arms trade with Georgia was legal. In September 2009, Ukrainian ambassador to Russia Kostyantyn Gryshchenko rejected allegations that the Ukrainian military had participated in the 2008 war with Russia. Ukrainian newspaper Segodnya reported in September 2009 that, according to an anonymous source, the office of the Prosecutor General of Ukraine confirmed that Ukrainian civilian specialists were present in Georgia for servicing the Georgian air defense systems between 5 and 13 August 2008. The Office of the Prosecutor General of Ukraine officially announced that it had found no violations in arms exports to Georgia and no Ukrainian military servicemen had participated in the conflict in Georgia. It also announced that no Ukrainian military hardware was present on Georgian territory and that Ukraine had not provided military aid to Georgia. In the spring of 2019, The New York Times published an investigation by journalist Michael Schwirtz into the 2016 murder of an electrician in Ukraine. A list containing the names of six Ukrainian men, including the victim, who Russian media or authorities apparently believe to have helped operate the Georgian air defenses in the 2008 war, was found in the computer of the confessed murderer. Russian intelligence officers hired him in Moscow to track down the men and later murder them. Former president Yushchenko wrote in 2022 that he arrived in Tbilisi during the war to give moral support to Georgia because he knew that Russia's next target would be Ukraine.
United Kingdom	On 9 August, the British Foreign Secretary, David Miliband said, "Russia has extended the fighting today well beyond South Ossetia, attacking the Georgian port of Poti, and the town of Gori, while Abkhaz forces have been shelling Georgian positions in the Upper Kodori valley. I deplore this." A British official said that an American-European delegation would arrive in Georgia on 9 August to negotiate the cessation of hostilities. Brian Fall, the British special representative to the South Caucuses, met with the US, EU, NATO and OSCE officials to discuss the crisis on the evening of 9 August. Liberal Democrat Spokesperson for Foreign and Commonwealth Affairs, Edward Davey, said on August 9, "We need a ceasefire and urgent negotiations to stop the military action escalating. There is now real danger of an all-out conflict between Russian and Georgian troops. There is also the risk of Abkhazia raising the stakes by cutting vital hydro-electricity supplies to Georgia. The UN must put pressure on Russia to pull back from the brink. If the Russians can show restraint, they will surely be well placed to offer negotiations." The Foreign and Commonwealth Office stated on August 10, "The offer of a ceasefire by the Georgian government is very welcome. We now look to the Russian Government to accept this offer and agree to an immediate ceasefire, in line with its international commitments to respect Georgian territorial integrity." Prime Minister Gordon Brown discussed Georgia with the French president and the UN Secretary-General. The Foreign Office urged British citizens to evacuate Georgia while flights were still operating. On 11 August, Prime Minister Gordon Brown said in a statement, "There is no justification for continued Russian military action in Georgia, which threatens the stability of the entire region and risks a humanitarian catastrophe. There is an immediate and pressing need to end the fighting and disengage all military forces in South Ossetia." He also said, "The Georgian government has offered a ceasefire, which I urge the Russians to reciprocate without delay." David Cameron, leader of the Conservative Party, called Russia a "massive and dangerous bully", and "the only language a bully understands is when someone stands up to them". Cameron predicted, "If you say 'This is Russia's backyard, this is a faraway country of which we know nothing, there's not really much you can do', if you take that sort of attitude, you will have more problems with Russia further down the line." Labour MP for Rotherham Denis MacShane wrote, "By ordering a full-scale military invasion of Georgia, [Putin] has revealed the true face of his autocratic rule." On 12 August, British Ambassador Denis Keefe approved the announcement of the cessation of hostilities by Medvedev, adding, "This is a beautiful place with a wonderful people. They don't deserve the suffering that has been inflicted by military operations." David Cameron said the Russian actions were "completely unacceptable". He urged the British Government to restrict visas for Russian citizens and advised several options regarding Russia. He said at his press conference, "The situation is clear, hundreds have been killed. Russia has used massive and disproportionate force…Countries that want international respect do not attack their neighbours. History has shown time and time again that if you leave aggression to go unchecked, you only store up graver problems for the future. Russia says it is fighting in defence of Russian citizens in South Ossetia. Who will they claim to be defending tomorrow? Russians in the Ukraine, Russians in the Baltic states, who are already members of the EU and NATO? This is a dangerous doctrine with worrying echoes from the darkest chapters of European history." However, Downing Street later rejected the proposal to withhold entry visas from Russian nationals. Instead, the idea of "smart sanctions" against the separatist officials of South Ossetia and Abkhazia, installed by the Kremlin, was discussed. Foreign Secretary David Miliband said on 12 August that the Russian forces should pull back to positions held before 7 August. Miliband said that Russian leaders must let the "Soviet past" go. He criticised the Russian "19th Century forms" of conduct and warned of consequences. He continued, "The sight of Russian tanks rolling into parts of a sovereign country on its neighbouring borders will have brought a chill down the spine of many people, rightly." Miliband supported Georgia's territorial integrity. On 13 August, the United Kingdom announced that joint naval exercises with Russia would no longer be held. Foreign Secretary David Mlilband welcomed Russia's signing of the ceasefire agreement on 16 August 2008. Miliband was "concerned" by recent Russian actions in Georgia. On 19 August, Foreign Secretary David Miliband met with Georgian president Saakashvili in Tbilisi. Miliband informed Saakashvili about NATO extraordinary meeting and condemned Russia for not pulling back from Georgia. Miliband said: "Every day that goes by after the deadline ... is a day that the world can see that Russia is not living up to its word." Miliband further said: "The world is asking Russia to live up to its commitments. With every commitment and with every failure to live up to that commitment, the international pressure will grow. A country relies on the word of its president being its bond." On 20 August, British Foreign Secretary David Miliband stated that "the formal process" began that would lead to Georgia's NATO membership and commented on the future of Georgia-NATO cooperation. Miliband saw Georgian internally displaced persons near Tbilisi and listened to their stories of suffering and then called for an independent investigation into "random killings" around Gori. On 27 August 2008, Foreign Secretary David Miliband visited Ukraine and discussed the war in Georgia with Ukraine's president. Miliband's visit aimed to prevent a crisis from developing in Crimea. He gave a speech in Kyiv, vigorously condemning Russia and stating that Europe's relations with Russia would no longer be the same as before. He condemned Medvedev's recognition of Abkhazia and South Ossetia, "[Medvedev's] unilateral attempt to redraw the map marks a moment of real significance. It is not just the end of the post-Cold War period of growing geopolitical calm in and around Europe. It is also the moment when countries are required to set out where they stand on the significant issues of nationhood and international law." Miliband said that starting a new cold war would be a "big responsibility" for Russian president Medvedev. Miliband compared Russia's attack on Georgia to the invasion of Czechoslovakia. He called for Russia to "change course". Later, Miliband said on BBC Radio 4 that the ideas of spheres of influences were "anathema" from the Second World War. Miliband denied that NATO aimed to surround Russia and that his arrival in Ukraine to "support their democratic choices" was a provocation towards Russia, which considers its neighbours as "enemies or vassals". In late August 2008, Gordon Brown said that the Western relationship with Russia should be revised, saying, "When Russia has a grievance over an issue such as South Ossetia, it should act multilaterally by consent rather than unilaterally by force. My message to Russia is simple: If you want to be welcome at the top table of organisations such as the G8, OECD and WTO, you must accept that with rights come responsibilities." On 1 September 2008, David Cameron urged the EU to impose harsh sanctions on Russia. He told BBC Radio 4, "The only language a bully understands is when you stand up to them." In early September 2008, The Daily Telegraph reported that Foreign Secretary David Miliband was insulted by Russian foreign minister Sergey Lavrov during their phone conversation. Malcolm Rifkind wrote on 5 September 2008: "However, if we are not careful, we may end up with a new Crimean War in the not too distant future. [...] A tough reaction by the West over Georgia and South Ossetia is necessary because Russia will be emboldened to repeat its behavior if it sees the West as weak." In September 2008, the Foreign and Commonwealth Office prohibited the participation of British Army bagpipers in the International Military Music Festival "The Kremlin Zorya" held in Russia. Brigadier Melville Jameson of the Edinburgh Military Tattoo and Vitaly Mironov of the Kremlin Zorya Foundation accused Foreign Secretary David Miliband of "playing politics" in a cultural event. Tony Brenton, the British Ambassador To Russia, said on 22 September that the entire West thought that Russian use of force was "disproportionate". On 27 September 2008, David Miliband denied the report that Russian foreign minister Sergey Lavrov had used the F-word with him. He further said, "We have a very strong interest in Russia being engaged - especially on Iran. We don't want a weak and humiliated Russia. We've always tried to reach out to Russia." In October 2008, British Foreign Secretary David Miliband, after being informed of BBC findings of alleged Georgian war crimes reported by Ossetians and initially calling Georgia's actions "reckless", he added that "the Russian response was reckless and wrong". Miliband noted, "It's important that the Russian narrative cannot start with Georgian actions; it has to start with the attacks on the Georgians from the South Ossetians, and that is the tit-for-tat that got out of control." William Hague warned that resuming negotiations with Russia while Russia was violating the ceasefire agreement "would show Russia that aggression pays off". Anonymous European diplomat was quoted as saying: "If we sell Georgia like that, we will have another war and who will be responsible for that?" In November 2008, William Hague again argued against the resumption of negotiations on the EU-Russia cooperation without any preconditions for Russia.
United States	United States Assistant Secretary of State Daniel Fried said on August 7, "It appears that the South Ossetians have instigated this uptake in violence. We have urged the Russians to urge their South Ossetian friends to pull back and show greater restraint. And we believe that the Russians ... are trying to do just that. We're urging the Georgians to exercise restraint, but it seems the South Ossetians are the provocative party." United States Department of State spokesman Gonzalo Gallegos said, "We're urging Moscow to press South Ossetia's de facto leaders to stop firing. We're urging Tbilisi to maintain restraint." Joe Biden, the head of the United States Senate Committee on Foreign Relations, said that the South Ossetian rebels provoked the conflict. Biden also said: "Moscow has a particular obligation to avoid further escalation of the situation." Howard Berman, chairman of the United States House Committee on Foreign Affairs, urged the cessation of hostilities and Russian withdrawal. Ileana Ros-Lehtinen was not surprised by Russia's aggressiveness and proposed the deployment of the international peacekeepers to the region. White House spokesman Gordon Johndroe said on 8 August, "All sides should bring an immediate end to the violence and engage in direct talks to resolve this matter peacefully." President of the United States George W. Bush had a conversation with Russian prime minister Vladimir Putin during the Beijing Olympics. The United States had asked Russia at the UN Security Council meeting not to allow irregular fighters from Russia to enter South Ossetia. Vladimir Putin told George Bush in Beijing that "many volunteers" would enter South Ossetia and it would be "very hard to maintain peace". According to the White House spokesman Dana Perino, there was an hour-long phone conversation after the opening ceremonies between Bush and Secretary of State Condoleezza Rice and the national security adviser Stephen Hadley. Dana Perino said that the United States called on "all parties, Georgians, South Ossetians and Russians to de-escalate the tension and avoid conflict." The US were "working on mediation efforts to secure a cease fire and we are urging the parties to restart their dialogue." Secretary of State Condoleezza Rice urged the ceasefire and stated on 8 August, "We call on Russia to cease attacks on Georgia by aircraft and missiles, respect Georgia's territorial integrity, and withdraw its ground combat forces from Georgian soil." She also said that the United States was in talks with Europe and the warring parties to halt the hostilities. Gonzalo Gallegos, a spokesman for the State Department, said the American delegate would be dispatched to the Caucasus "to engage with the parties in the conflict". Matthew Bryza, Deputy Assistant Secretary of State, was being dispatched to negotiate cessation of hostilities. John McCain, the US presidential candidate, stated, "Russia should immediately and unconditionally cease its military operations and withdraw all forces from sovereign Georgian territory. What is most critical now is to avoid further confrontation between Russian and Georgian military force. The consequences for Euro-Atlantic stability and security are grave. [...] Finally, the international community needs to establish a truly independent and neutral peacekeeping force in South Ossetia." Barack Obama, the US presidential candidate, said in a statement, "I strongly condemn the outbreak of violence in Georgia, and urge an immediate end to armed conflict. Now is the time for Georgia and Russia to show restraint and to avoid an escalation to full-scale war." Obama called for respect for Georgia's territorial integrity. Obama also said that "What is clear is that Russia has invaded Georgia's sovereignty, has encroached on Georgia's sovereignty, and it is very important for us to resolve this issue as quickly as possible." Analysts compared the statements of both presidential candidates and extrapolated their decision-making. Both candidates were probably betting their victory on the conflict. Approval ratings of McCain rose by mid-August because McCain had tougher stance on Russia, while Obama chose to vacation on Hawaii. An anonymous American military official observing the Russian actions in the conflict zone before the war commented, "The build-up of forces was more than expected, and they moved earlier than we thought they would." US military officials were considering how to evacuate around 3,000 US citizens from Georgia, and the US embassy issued a warning against traveling to the conflict zones. American forces present in Georgia were not participating in the conflict. The US trainers were not participating in the conflict between Russia and Georgia. The United States Department of Defense said that Georgia had not requested aid. The Pentagon and the United States European Command were observing the developments. The Pentagon announced on 11 August that they had been analyzing the war in Georgia to decide the evacuation of up to a hundred American military trainers. The former United States Ambassador to the United Nations, Richard Holbrooke, commented on Russia's intentions, "They have two goals. To do a creeping annexation of South Ossetia and Abkhazia and, secondly, to overthrow Saakashvili, who is a tremendous thorn in their side." U.S. ambassador to the United Nations Zalmay Khalilzad said, "We deplore the Russian military action". According to the State Department statement, the Russian chargé d'affaires was called by the deputy Secretary of State John Negroponte. The statement said, "We deplore today's Russian attacks by strategic bombers and missiles, which are threatening civilian lives." On 9 August, an anonymous senior American representative commented on Russia's actions against Georgia, "It is simply not acceptable to reject an offer of a cease-fire and international mediation." A senior official commented on the possibility of military aid to Georgia, "We are not talking about anything beyond diplomacy at this point." An official said that Russia's worries about NATO expansion might have been behind Russia's "disproportionate" action in Georgia. President George W. Bush called the Russian bombings a dangerous escalation. Bush said in Beijing, "The attacks are occurring in regions of Georgia far from the zone of conflict in South Ossetia. They mark a dangerous escalation in the crisis. [...] Georgia is a sovereign nation, and its territorial integrity must be respected. We have urged an immediate halt to the violence and a stand-down by all troops. We call for an end to the Russian bombings, and a return by the parties to the status quo of August the 6th." Gordon Johndroe, White House spokesman, stated American president had talked to both Russian and Georgian presidents. Presidential candidates John McCain and Barack Obama independently spoke by phone with Georgian president Saakashvili on 9 August. McCain declared in a statement, "Tensions and hostilities between Georgians and Ossetians are in no way justification for Russian troops crossing an internationally recognized border." McCain stated that this was his second talk with Saakashvili after the invasion. McCain also said, "For many years, I have warned against Russian actions that undermine the sovereignty of its neighbors. Unfortunately, we have seen in recent days Russia demonstrate that these concerns were well-founded." Obama said in a statement, "I condemn Russia's aggressive actions and reiterate my call for an immediate ceasefire. [...] Russia also must end its cyber war against Georgian government websites." Obama supported the idea of international peacekeepers in Georgia and that the crisis was due to the "lack of a neutral and effective peacekeeping force operating under an appropriate UN mandate." An anonymous American official said that Russia had notified the US of the deployment of the Black Sea Fleet to Abkhazia. One American official commented: "Why that's a legitimate use of military assets is beyond me." Another official stated that "There is panic in Tbilisi", and added that Russia used Tupolev Tu-22 supersonic bombers and ballistic missiles in Georgia. Anonymous American official told the CNN that the use of Russian strategic bombers outside the disputed region was "far disproportionate" "response to the charge that Georgia has attacked Russian peacekeepers" and such "dangerous escalation" possibly intended to punish Georgia for NATO aspirations. The official reported that Europe viewed Russia as having "crossed a line of unacceptable behavior" and this was "an emerging unified view among our key allies". The impact of the Georgian withdrawal of 2,000 service members from Iraq on the coalition operations would not be significant, according to the US military. On 10 August, Jim Jeffrey, deputy national security adviser, stated, "We have made it clear to the Russians that if the disproportionate and dangerous escalation on the Russian side continues, that this will have a significant long-term impact on U.S.-Russian relations." US envoy to the UN, Zalmay Khalilzad, said at the fourth Security Council meeting on the war that Abkhazia participated in a "Russian-based military offensive" in the Kodori Gorge, which constituted a "direct challenge to a UN Security Council-mandated mission." Khalilzad said, "We believe the Security Council must take urgent action. We must condemn Russia's military assault on the sovereign state of Georgia." At the UN Security Council meeting, Zalmay Khalilzad accused Russia of having a "regime change" goal in Georgia and of thwarting peace efforts. Khalilzad said that Lavrov had told Rice on the morning of 10 August "that a democratically elected president of Georgia -- and I quote -- must go." Khalilzad asked the Russian ambassador Vitaly Churkin whether Russia sought to depose Georgia's government. Churkin admitted that a "confidential phone call" took place and said that high-ranking government officials sometimes "become an obstacle." The United States approved of the Georgian pullout from South Ossetia. Dana Perino, White House Spokeswoman, stated in Beijing, "That is one of the conditions that needed to occur so that we could have a cease-fire. This, if true, could help us lead to a peaceful solution." Bush had spoken with the Chinese officials. The United States said that the Russian response to the Georgian pullout from the conflict zone would serve as a major indicator of the actual goals of Russia in South Ossetia. Georgian president Saakashvili told the German newspaper that he had "full support" of US president Bush, adding: "He understands that it's not really about Georgia but in a certain sense it's also an aggression against America." Analyst Janusz Bugajski said that Russia wanted to see the US reaction to Russia's "re-imperialization". Bill Kristol suggested in an opinion piece to "consider the implications of our turning away from Georgia for other aspiring pro-Western governments in the neighborhood, like Ukraine's. [...] Is it not true today, as it was in the 1920s and ’30s, that delay and irresolution on the part of the democracies simply invite future threats and graver dangers?" On 10 August, Vice President Dick Cheney said in a phone conversation with Saakashvili, "Russian aggression must not go unanswered, and that its continuation would have serious consequences for its relations with the United States, as well as the broader international community." The statement of Cheney's office said on 11 August, "The vice president praised President Saakashvili for his government's restraint, offers of cease-fire, and disengagement of Georgian forces from the zone of conflict in the South Ossetian region of the country." On 11 August, Richard Holbrooke declared that Russia deliberately provoked the war to coincide with the Olympic Games and Russia's next target would be Ukraine. On 11 August, George W. Bush told NBC in Beijing, "I was very firm with Vladimir Putin -- he and I have got a good relationship -- just like I was firm with the Russian president. I expressed my grave concern about the disproportionate response of Russia and that we strongly condemn, you know, bombing outside of South Ossetia. It was just interesting to me that here we are, trying to promote peace and harmony, and we're witnessing a conflict take place." Bush also told NBC, "My administration has been engaged with both sides of this, trying to get a ceasefire." Bush told Putin on 8 August that "This violence is unacceptable" and that all forces withdraw to the August 6 "status quo ante." However, Russian military action in Georgia did not stop. On 11 August, Bush, on his return trip from Beijing, talked with the leaders of the United Kingdom, Lithuania, Poland, and phoned Saakashvili. Bush also talked with Silvio Berlusconi and Angela Merkel the next day. John McCain stated that "the very existence of independent Georgia and the survival of its democratically elected government are at stake". He warned Russia of "long-term negative consequences" on Russia's international standing. McCain declared that Russian action aimed at "toppling the democratically elected government of Georgia" was "unacceptable to all the Democratic countries of the world, and should draw us together in universal condemnation of Russian aggression." He stated: "NATO's decision to withhold a membership action plan for Georgia might have been viewed as a green light by Russia for its attacks on Georgia, and I urge the NATO allies to revisit the decision." McCain concluded his remarks by saying: "World history is often made in remote, obscure countries." John McCain had threatened by 11 August that the Group of Eight would exclude Russia. Barack Obama stated, "No matter how this conflict started, Russia has escalated it well beyond the dispute over South Ossetia and invaded another country." An anonymous State Department official compared the current Russian invasion to the historical invasions by the Soviet Union. More than 170 American citizens were evacuated from Georgia by the United States Department of State. Although the families of American diplomats were permitted to evacuate Georgia over the weekend, the State Department stated that diplomats would not leave the country. A third evacuation convoy to Armenia was arranged on 12 August. U.S. president George W. Bush said on 11 August, "There's evidence that Russian forces may soon begin bombing the civilian airport in the capital city." George Bush expressed his concern in a statement that the recent "dramatic and brutal escalation" by Russia "would be inconsistent with assurances we have received from Russia that its objectives were limited to restoring the status quo in South Ossetia that existed before fighting began on August the 6th." Bush said, "It now appears that an effort may be underway to depose [Georgia's] duly elected government. Russia has invaded a sovereign neighboring state and threatens a democratic government elected by its people. Such an action is unacceptable in the 21st century." Bush urged Russia to "reverse the course it appears to be on" and sign the EU-mediated ceasefire agreement, otherwise Russia would "jeopardise" its standing with the West. Bush, who had few options how to respond to Russian actions, made this statement in an hour after he arrived from Beijing. Georgian president Saakashvili had already accepted the ceasefire agreement before Bush's statement. The BBC reported that the "strongest" American official statement "aimed at drawing a line in the sand" to avert the unseating of the government of Georgia. Secretary of State Condoleezza Rice discussed the war with the foreign ministers of the G-8 by phone. Robert Wood, State Department spokesman, said that foreign ministers supported Georgia. The ministers urged Russia to agree to the ceasefire, meanwhile expressing anxiety over the fate of civilians. Wood also said that although the U.S. would evacuate Georgian soldiers from Iraq, "there are no discussions about the U.S. getting involved militarily." Russia was not invited to a phone conference of the G7. A spokesman for the State Department stated, "We want to see the Russians stand down." Zalmay Khalilzad approved Vitaly Churkin's statement that Russia did not intend to depose the government of Georgia, but warned "there is a range of tools in the toolbox" in case of non-cessation of hostilities by Russia. As Georgian president Saakashvili expressed his frustration with the weak international reaction to Russia's advance into Georgia, Western diplomats arrived in Tbilisi on August 11. Deputy US Assistant Secretary Matthew Bryza criticized Russian advances: "What does this have to do with protecting Russian peacekeepers and passport-keepers?" Bryza promised aid to the Georgians. Matthew Bryza said that he now knew that Russian "railroad troops" entered Abkhazia months ago "to establish a supply line for a Russian invasion." Bryza accused Russia of lying about its actions. He accused South Ossetian peacekeepers of attacking Georgian villages. Bryza stated that Russian military did not stop attack despite Georgia's offer of ceasefire and he could not "understand how Russia wants to be seen as a reliable supplier of natural gas to Europe, when it has made several attempts to blow up the BTC (Baku-Tbilisi-Ceyhan) pipeline." He denied American guilt for Georgian military action against South Ossetian separatists. The US Embassy in Georgia, describing a Matthew Bryza press conference on 12 August, called the war an "incursion by one of the world's strongest powers to destroy the democratically-elected government of a smaller neighbor". American officials said that Russia was provoking Georgia, and that the United States had "always counseled restraint to the Georgians," even sending Condoleezza Rice to Georgia to temper the Georgian leadership's overreaction. One State Department official said, "We thought we had an understanding with the Russians that any response [to Georgian military action] would be South Ossetia-focused. Clearly it's not." Virtually no satellite spying was conducted in the region, as the United States focused on other countries and therefore could not detect the deployment of Russian forces to the Georgian border. American military trainers were remaining in Georgia because, as an American official said, "removing them might inadvertently signal to the world that we are abandoning our ally, which we most certainly are not." Anonymous Pentagon official told the CNN that the Russian air strikes had destroyed the Georgian military command system and the Georgian authorities could not know the situation on the ground. On 12 August, John McCain said in a press release, "Georgia asked for a ceasefire, and Russia responded by bombing the Tbilisi Airport." He declared, "Today, we are all Georgians." McCain said in an interview: "Of course, we have to deal with Russia, and we deal with Putin. But it has to be on a very realistic basis. And not one that there's any illusions about his ambitions." McCain then stated that "Russian ambitions are to restore the old Russian Empire." Condoleezza Rice told ABC News that Russian "military operations need to stop". Rice stated that the United States "stands for the territorial integrity of Georgia" and "so forces that arrived after August 6 need to move back to their pre-August 6th positions." She said that Russia damaged its prospects for integrating into international organisations and Russian actions were from "another time", further adding, "We are not in 1968 and the message has been very clear to Russia that it cannot operate that way." Rice later said "The Georgians have agreed to a ceasefire, the Russians need to stop their military operations as they have apparently said that they will, but those military operations really do now need to stop because calm needs to be restored." U.S. Deputy Assistant Secretary of State Matthew Bryza commented in Tbilisi on possible US military intervention: "I hope we'll never come to the question of what we do if Russia refuses to observe international law." The State Department called the Russian invasion "plain and simple blatant aggression on the part of Russia". A naval exercise with the participation of France, the United Kingdom, the United States, and Russia planned on 15–23 August in the Sea of Japan would no longer be held. A senior American official said, "In the wake of this conflict, there is no way that we can proceed with this joint exercise at this time." On 13 August, Matthew Bryza in Tbilisi said "incredible reports of serious violence" had emerged from South Ossetia and he believed them. President George W. Bush declared, "I've just met with my national security team to discuss the crisis in Georgia. [...] The United States of America stands with the democratically elected government of Georgia." Bush was alarmed "about reports that Georgian citizens of all ethnic origins are not being protected." Bush said that after visiting France, Condoleezza Rice would visit Georgia to "continue our efforts to rally the free world in the defense of a free Georgia." Bush deployed American military personnel to Georgia to supervise a "vigorous and ongoing" humanitarian assistance effort, adding, "We expect Russia to ensure that all lines of communication and transport, including seaports, airports, roads, and airspace, remain open for the delivery of humanitarian assistance and for civilian transit." Bush expected Russia would observe the ceasefire and further stated, "Russia's ongoing action raise serious questions about its intentions in Georgia and the region." Bush said the United States had supported Russia "to integrate into the diplomatic, political, economic, and security structures of the 21st century," however, Russian attack on Georgia, which was "inconsistent with the principles of those institutions", put these efforts "at risk". Bush stated, "To begin to repair the damage to its relations with the United States, Europe, and other nations, and to begin restoring its place in the world, Russia must keep its word and act to end this crisis." Earlier, the deployment of mid-level official Matthew Bryza to Georgia had been criticized as a weak signal to Russia. Bush's order to deploy American military to Georgia apparently intended to counter Russia's sway in the Caucasus. A vacation on Bush's ranch in Crawford, Texas, earlier planned to start on 14 August, was delayed. That day, an American Boeing C-17 Globemaster III was the first transport aircraft to deliver supplies to Tbilisi. A senior official from the Pentagon said that the goal of the humanitarian assistance was "to show to Russia that we can come to the aid of a European ally, and that we can do it at will, whenever and wherever we want." President Bush did not order Rice to visit Moscow. Rice notified the Russian foreign minister about the humanitarian aid. Condoleezza Rice declared at the State Department, "This is not 1968, and the invasion of Czechoslovakia, where Russia can invade its neighbor, occupy a capital, overthrow a government, and get away with it. Things have changed." American officials stated that the Russian bid for membership in the World Trade Organization would probably be reconsidered, and membership in the Group of Eight would be reexamined. Rice also said that day, "I don't think that there's any doubt that Russia has already in its actions called into question some of its desire to be integrated into these institutions." Rice said in the afternoon, "Right now, the key is to remind Russia that it has an obligation to stop its military activities, remind Russia that it is not to further engage in activities that threaten the territorial integrity and sovereignty of Georgia." Rice endorsed the statements by both McCain and Obama, "I know that they are at this moment of difficult diplomacy that they are doing what they can to support the efforts of the administration." White House spokeswoman Dana Perino said that Rice would depart on the evening of 13 August. Before she departs for Tbilisi, Rice also stated, "If indeed Russia is violating a ceasefire, and I have to say the reports are not encouraging about Russia's respect for the ceasefire ... that will only serve to deepen the isolation to which Russia is moving." Saakashvili's allegations of the United States taking over Georgian sea ports and airports were dismissed by the American officials. Dana Perino said that America "had credible reports that Russia is violating the cease-fire agreement, including, as (Bush) mentioned, the bombing of vessels and the blocking of the port, which we're very concerned about." One senior American official commented that Russia could use the fifth point of the French-negotiated ceasefire agreement to gain further ground in Georgia and that international recognition of Russian troops in Georgia as peacekeepers "is absurd at this point." An Atlantic Council member said: "The last thing Russia wants is a war with the West. If they came eye to eye with NATO warplanes, they would retreat." On 14 August, Condoleezza Rice held a meeting with French president Sarkozy during the afternoon. She said, "It is time for this crisis to be over. The Russian president has said that their military operations have halted. We would hope that he is true to his word and that those operations will halt." Sarkozy gave Rice the ceasefire agreement. After meeting with Sarkozy, Rice said, "The United States of America stands strongly, as the president of France just said, for the territorial integrity of Georgia." She said, "We will work very hard to see if we can bring an end to this crisis. It is long overdue. Too many innocent people have died. And Georgia, whose territorial integrity and independence and sovereignty we fully respect, must be able to get back to normal life." Rice was visiting Georgia to compel the Georgian leadership to accept the French-brokered ceasefire agreement, which would grant additional powers to Russian peacekeepers outside of South Ossetia within undisputed Georgia. An anonymous official said that some changes to the ceasefire agreement could be made. Former US ambassador to NATO Robert E. Hunter said although the European ceasefire proposal mostly stopped the hostilities, it left "the Russians in total control," since "There is nothing in here about the inviolability of Georgia's frontiers." According to Le Canard enchaîné newspaper, Condoleezza Rice had raised a matter with Sarkozy over the ambiguity of the ceasefire agreement regarding the territorial integrity of Georgia. Rice-Saakashvili talks in Tbilisi was attended by Saakashvili's adviser Daniel Kunin, son of Madeleine Kunin. Spokeswoman Dana M. Perino commented on Sergey Lavrov's remark about forgetting Georgia's territorial integrity, "I would consider that to be bluster from the foreign minister of Russia. We will ignore it." American diplomat Matthew Bryza told the BBC, "Russia, a country with 30 times the population [of Georgia], decided to roll into its much smaller neighbour and tried to roll over it. It failed to roll over Georgia, but it would never have even thought of doing this if Georgia were already a member of NATO." On 14 August, United States Secretary of Defense Robert Gates said that the American endeavors to create "an ongoing and long-term strategic dialogue with Russia" would be reconsidered. He said, "If Russia does not step back from its aggressive posture and actions in Georgia, the U.S.-Russian relationship could be adversely affected for years to come." He dismissed the possibility of the US military intervention in Georgia. Gates suggested that the Russian real aim was to warn Georgia and other former Soviet states against "daring to try to integrate with the West." Gates said, "The United States spent 45 years working very hard to avoid a military confrontation with Russia. I see no reason to change that approach today." Gates said that the Defense Department "will re-examine the entire gamut of our military-to-military activities with Russia and will make changes as necessary and appropriate, depending on Russian actions in the days ahead." Gates further said that Russia was "interested in reasserting Russia's, not only Russia's great power or superpower status, but in reasserting Russia's traditional spheres of influence." Gates was asked whether Putin could be depended on anymore, and he responded, "'Anymore' is an interesting add. I have never believed that one should make national security policy on the basis of trust." Gates also said that day, "This year [the clashes between Georgians and Ossetians] escalated very quickly and it seemed to me that Russians were prepared to take advantage of an opportunity and did so very aggressively." Gates and Vice Chairman of the Joint Chiefs of Staff James Cartwright expressed hopes that the American military in Georgia would not have to exercise the right of self-defense. An anonymous US official told the Associated Press that Russia was intentionally acting to incapacitate the defeated Georgian military. Aides to President Bush accused Russian officials of lying about Russia's actions. Concerns were raised that the Russian invasion of Georgia would put the US-Russia cooperation on terrorism and nuclear disarmament at stake. President Bush visited the Central Intelligence Agency to review the situation on the ground in Georgia. Bush said that Rice would report to him after returning from Georgia. On 15 August, US president George W. Bush stated his support for Georgia. Bush explained the rationale behind the U.S. support of Georgia by saying that Georgia was "a courageous democracy and "The people of Georgia have cast their lot with the free world, and we will not cast them aside." Bush declared, "A contentious relationship with Russia is not in America's interests, and a contentious relationship with America is not in Russia's interests. [...] Bullying and intimidation are not acceptable ways to conduct foreign policy in the 21st century. [...] To begin to repair its relations with the United States and Europe and other nations and to begin restoring its place in the world, Russia must respect the freedom of its neighbors." Bush had made three statements regarding Russia in the Rose Garden of the White House between 11 and 15 August since his arrival from Beijing. Bush talked with Toomas Hendrik Ilves, President of Estonia, by phone. After making the statement, Bush left the White House for Texas, and Condoleezza Rice was expected to arrive in Texas on 16 August. Gordon Johndroe, White House deputy press secretary, said on Air Force One, "We need to see where this all ends up. We are hopeful that we can continue cooperation with the Russians _ and that's across the board. But a lot of this depends on Russia, and what Russia's actions are in the near future. Right now, their actions have been inconsistent ... with the fundamental principles of a Europe whole, free, and at peace. So cooperation on a wide range of issues going forward depends on the actions that Russia takes." Bush also supported Georgia in his weekly Saturday radio address, which was released on 15 August by the White House. A State Department official said that Rice would deliver to Tbilisi an improved version of the ceasefire agreement that would not allow Russia "to maintain a presence inside Georgia". Rice arrived in Tbilisi on 15 August. Rice held a five-hour meeting with Georgian president Saakashvili in Tbilisi. She promised economic help instead of military aid. During the meeting between Rice and Saakashvili, Russian armoured vehicles pushed towards Tbilisi. Georgian president Saakashvili was compelled to agree to the ceasefire, which was vague about the Russian withdrawal to prewar positions. Rice said, "Our most urgent task today is the immediate and orderly withdrawal of Russian armed forces and the return of those forces to Russia. With this signature by Georgia, this must take place - and take place now." Rice said that international monitors and peacekeepers should enter Georgia. Rice said at the uncompleted presidential palace that the "free world" would discuss how to bring "profound implications" upon Russia at the same time as nine Russian armoured personnel carriers were advancing towards Tbilisi. She stated, "You can't be a responsible member of institutions that are democratic and underscore democratic values and on the other hand act in this way against one of your neighbours." Rice said she had been informed that Russian president Medvedev would accept the same ceasefire agreement that Saakashvili had signed. Saakashvili called Russians "barbarians" as he stood alongside Rice. After leaving Georgia, Rice then visited president George Bush at Crawford in Texas. On 16 August, John McCain accused Russia of attempting to sabotage energy delivery routes and said that America should not be reliant on foreign supplies. Bush stated in Crawford that "Russia has put its aspirations at risk." Bush welcomed the ceasefire agreement on 16 August as a "hopeful step" and declared, "Now Russia needs to honor the agreement and withdraw its forces, and of course end military operations. [...] Georgia's borders should command the same respect as every other nation's. There's no room for debate on this matter." National Security Council spokesman Gordon Johndroe stated that Bush spoke with the prime minister of Canada and president of Latvia. Condoleezza Rice said, "From my point of view, and I am in contact with the French, the Russians are perhaps already not honouring their word." Rice stated that the ceasefire agreement allowed only original Russian peacekeepers stationed in the conflict zone before 7 August to monitor designated areas. According to Rice, French president Sarkozy was told by his counterpart that Russia would pull out as soon as Georgian president Saakashvili signed the ceasefire. Robert Gates stated that the ceasefire agreement was still working, "There don't seem to be any aggressive Russian actions occurring." The Wall Street Journal reported on 16 August that the Russian invasion of Georgia fueled support for the acquisitions of the modern weapons, such as planes, by the United States. Former diplomat Richard Holbrooke had commented on the Russian compliance with the ceasefire by 17 August, "If they violate their own agreement, that has even more serious consequences. Each hour, each day, is a test." On 17 August, Robert Gates said, "I think that there is a real concern that Russia has turned the corner here and is headed back toward its past rather than toward its future, and my hope is that we will see actions in the weeks and months to come that provide us some reassurance." He added that the US would "e-evaluate the direction of the strategic relationship with Russia." Gates said that Putin "clearly, as far as I'm concerned, has the upper hand right now" and had "his hand on the steering wheel". He commented on the disputed regions that "no one should try and force them back into a full relationship with Georgia". Gates called the Russian nuclear threat against Poland "empty rhetoric" and said: "The truth of the matter is, Russia is not going to launch nuclear missiles at anybody. The Poles know that. We know it." Condoleezza Rice said, "Well, I just know that the Russian president said several days ago Russian military operations would stop. They didn't. This time, I hope he means it. You know the word of the Russian president needs to be upheld by his forces." Rice made a lengthy comment on Medvedev's announcement of the withdrawal and also said: "If Russia thought it was going to be able to bring down the Georgia state, bring down the democratic institutions, it has failed. [...] If the Russians intended this as intimidation, they have done nothing but harden the attitudes of the small states around them. I think the Russians have made a significant mistake here." Rice also said that "people are going to begin to wonder if Russia can be trusted." Before leaving for a NATO meeting in Brussels, Rice said, "Russia's reputation as a potential partner in international institutions, diplomatic, political, security, economic, is frankly, in tatters. Russia will pay a price. We will look seriously with our allies and bilaterally at the consequences of this Russian action ... Georgia will rebuild, Russia's reputation may not be rebuilt." George Bush did not make any statement regarding Georgia on 17 August. Two Congressmen Allyson Schwartz and Bill Shuster said they would propose a resolution that Russia must be stripped of the right to host 2014 Winter Olympics for Russian military invasion of Georgia before the opening of the Beijing Olympics. An ex-envoy to the United Nations, John R. Bolton, stated that the US government failed to cope with the invasion properly and Russia should not get away even in case of pullout from Georgia. An ex-functionary from the White House stated: "The United States is not going to go to war with Russia over the borders of South Ossetia and so the tools available to us are largely diplomatic. For all those critics who claim the Administration has not relied sufficiently on diplomacy, this is what it looks like when there are few good military options, and one has to rely primarily on diplomacy." American officials stated that impartial international peacekeepers should replace Russian peacekeepers in Georgia's conflict zones. Deputy national security adviser James Franklin Jeffrey had told reporters by 17 August that after President Bush was told of Russia having used two SS-21s in Georgia, Bush "immediately" discussed the matter with Vladimir Putin in Beijing on 8 August. By 18 August, White House spokesman Gordon D. Johndroe urged Russia to respect its commitment to withdrawal: "If it rolled in after Aug. 6, it needs to roll out." On 18 August, Condoleezza Rice said en route to the NATO gathering that Georgia's NATO membership wouldn't be on the meeting's agenda. Rice said that Russia was oppressing its neighbours by "using the one tool that it has always used when it wished to deliver a message." Rice said, "I think the very fact of the alliance meeting and considering what steps it will take to assist Georgia will send a very clear message." Rice said: "We have to deny Russian strategic objectives, which are clearly to undermine Georgia's democracy, to use its military capability to damage and in some cases destroy Georgian infrastructure and to try and weaken the Georgian state." Rice said that the NATO meeting would confirm to the Eastern European members that they were "now out of Russia's reach." Rice said, "The effort to somehow assert Russian power or influence by military means is something we've been seeing for a while." Rice also called Russian deployment of strategic bomber patrols off the coast of Alaska since Kosovo's recognition a "very dangerous game". One anonymous administration official said that Vice President Dick Cheney's office had been considering to increase military assistance to Georgia before August 2008, while Rice was opposed to such move. An anonymous official said, "But now Russia's actions have turned even the doves into hawks." An official said that although Georgia's military capabilities were not a match for Russia, "we can help them better defend themselves." On 19 August, Condoleezza Rice stated after the meeting of the NATO council, "It is time for the Russian President to keep his word to withdraw Russian forces from Georgia, back to the August 6/7 status quo ante and to return, in fact, all forces that were not in South Ossetia at the time of that – of the outbreak of that conflict. That means Russian peacekeepers “who were there” are one thing, but those who reinforced the zone of conflict in any way should also return to the status quo ante. [...] it's quite clear that Russia has become a party to this conflict." Rice further stated, "So the United States doesn't seek to isolate Russia. The behavior of Russia in this most recent crisis is isolating Russia from the principles of cooperation among nations of the communities of states when you start invading small neighbors, bombing civilian infrastructure, going into villages and wreaked havoc and wanton destruction of this infrastructure. That's what isolates Russia." Rice approved the NATO statement. Rice said in an interview with CBS News that Russia would be the "outlaw" of the conflict. A spokesman for the National Security Council, Gordon Johndroe, urged Russia to withdraw from Georgia quickly: "It didn't take them really three or four days to get into Georgia, and it really shouldn't take them three or four days to get out." After he visited Georgia on 18 August, Senator Joe Biden announced a proposal to provide $1 billion in aid to Georgia and warned of grave consequences for Russia's actions. He announced on 20 August that the Jackson–Vanik amendment would no longer be repealed. Condoleezza Rice was expected to sign an agreement with Poland on 20 August to install an anti-missile shield in Poland. A similar military agreement between the US and the Czech Republic had already been signed. White House spokesman Gordon Johndroe commented on the Russian withdrawal during his trip to Florida, "We are beginning to see the early signs of some withdrawal. It is not significant, and it needs to increase." President Bush told a meeting of Veterans of Foreign Wars in Florida that Abkhazia and South Ossetia "must remain a part of Georgia." Condoleezza Rice commented on Medvedev's statements in an interview with CNN, "First, his troops were going to be out on Monday, then his troops were going to be out on Wednesday, now his troops are going to be out on Friday. I'm beginning to wonder if the Russian president is ever going to keep his word, or can he keep his word, or what is going on there?" Senator Joe Lieberman met with Georgian president Saakashvili in Tbilisi and proposed that the United States supply Georgia with armaments. On 21 August, Spokesman Gordon Johndroe said in Crawford, "The withdrawal needs to take place, and needs to take place now." Georgian president Saakashvili was told by Bush on the phone that he "expects Russia to abide by its agreement to withdraw forces." Three U.S. Navy ships carrying humanitarian aid were sent to Georgia through the Turkish Straits. A spokesman at the U.S. naval base in Crete, Paul Farley, said the warships would arrive in Georgia "within the next week," but he didn't reveal the harbor where the ships would dock. Henrietta H. Fore, the administrator of the United States Agency for International Development, stated, "We anticipate staying as long as there is need and helping to set up the economy, because it's very important that the economy begins to take on its normal aspects. But it depends on our ability to do full assessments throughout Georgia." By 22 August 2008, the new US Ambassador to Russia, John Beyrle, claimed in an interview with Russian newspaper Kommersant that the initial Russian "reaction" to Georgia's "attack" was legitimate, however, "Russia has gone too far". Beyrle said that the US "did not want all this to happen." However, the US embassy in Moscow stated that the words of the ambassador were incorrectly translated. Richard Holbrooke wrote that "Public commitments to help rebuild Georgia are the best way to prevent Russia" from toppling Saakashvili. Spokesman Gordon Johndroe said on August 22 that Bush spoke with Sarkozy and "the two agreed that Russia is not in compliance and that Russia needs to come into compliance now. They have not completely withdrawn from areas considered undisputed territory, and they need to do that." Robert Wood, State Department spokesman, said on August 23 that Russians "have without a doubt failed to live up to their obligations. Establishing checkpoints, buffer zones, are definitely not part of the agreement." Although Russia claimed it had withdrawn from Georgia by 23 August, checkpoints remained there. Gordon Johndroe criticized Russia for this. American diplomat Matthew Bryza told Ekho Moskvy radio, "I think what Russia has done now is the strongest catalyst it could have created to get Georgia in NATO." The U.S. position on Russian withdrawal was supported by Germany, with one German official saying, "Russia has begun its withdrawal from Georgia, but not completed it." Germany had suggested that the EU arrange a donor conference for Georgia. The United States Secretary of Commerce Carlos Gutierrez said Russian participation in the Group of Eight and its chances to join the World Trade Organization would be influenced by its actions in Georgia, "That is all at risk now." On 23 August, Barack Obama questioned Russia's claims of a withdrawal from Georgia and called on Russia not to jeopardize its standing. On 25 August, the Pentagon declared that Russia had not complied with the ceasefire agreement and Russian troops had not been pulled out from Georgia. It was announced that George Bush was sending Vice President Dick Cheney to visit Georgia, Ukraine, and Azerbaijan. Defense Department spokesman Bryan Whitman said on 25 August that the daily cost of the humanitarian mission to Georgia was now $1 million, and the total expenditure was $18.3 million as of 25 August 2008. Whitman said the Defense Department had disbursed about $7.2 million for the aid. The State Department issued a travel warning for Americans. The White House said that the recognition of Abkhazia and South Ossetia could be carried out only by the United Nations. On 26 August, George Bush condemned the recognition of Abkhazia and South Ossetia by Russia. The presidential candidates John McCain and Barack Obama also condemned the Russian recognition. On 28 August, White House spokeswoman Dana Perino commented on the Russian accusation that the United States provoked the war to get John McCain elected, "To suggest that the United States orchestrated this on behalf of a political candidate – it sounds not rational." Perino commented on Russian military officials who had told Putin of American military participation in the conflict, "Those claims first and foremost are patently false, but it also sounds like his defence officials who said they believed this to be true are giving him really bad advice." State Department deputy spokesman Robert Wood said, "Russia is responsible for the crisis. For the Russians to say they are not responsible for what happened in Georgia is ludicrous. ... Russia is to blame for this crisis, and the world is responding to what Russia has done." Chairman of the Joint Chiefs of Staff, Admiral Michael Mullen, stated that the US would continue military cooperation with Georgia, which was "a very important country to us". On 2 September 2008, The New York Times reported that, according to officials from the Pentagon, State Department, and White House, the Bush administration was considering how to restore Georgia's military capabilities; however, no decisions had been made. On 3 September 2008, the government of the United States announced that $1 billion in humanitarian and economic aid would be provided to Georgia to restore civilian infrastructure. The aid did not envision any military assistance to Georgia. 61 American planes and two ships had already delivered $30 million worth of humanitarian assistance to Georgia, including 1,200 tons of food and other provisions. Bush had decreed that federal agencies insure ships arriving in Georgia. Condoleezza Rice stated, "The free world cannot allow the destiny of a small independent country to be determined by the aggression of a larger neighbor." It was expected that the United States would no longer observe the agreement with Russia on nuclear cooperation. On 4 September 2008, during his visit to Georgia, Dick Cheney called the Russian invasion "an illegitimate, unilateral attempt" to alter the borders of Georgia. Cheney stated, "Russia's actions have cast grave doubts on Russia's intentions and on its reliability as an international partner." Cheney said the US would support Georgia's entry into NATO. Cheney's visit demonstrated the strong US support of Georgia, and Cheney stated, "Now it is the responsibility of the free world to rally to the side of Georgia." Cheney also met with American forces delivering the humanitarian assistance during his four-and-a-half-hour-long visit to Georgia. An official accompanying Cheney said that economic assistance to Georgia was far more important than military assistance and that issues regarding the distribution of American humanitarian assistance had subsided. As of 4 September 2008, about $38 million in American humanitarian aid had been delivered to Georgia. Cheney's goal was to lobby for the building of a new gas pipeline in the Caucasus, avoiding the Russian soil during his tour. Cheney also visited Ukraine on 5 September 2008, where the Russian invasion of Georgia provoked a political crisis. Cheney said that the United States was on the side of Ukraine and supported Ukraine's NATO membership. After meeting with President Yushchenko, Cheney said that Ukraine must not yield to Russia's "threat of tyranny, economic blackmail and military invasion or intimidation." Yushchenko told Cheney, "On the majority of the issues, including Georgia, we have an understanding with the United States." Cheney also met with Ukraine's prime minister Yulia Tymoshenko. Condoleezza Rice said in Portugal that Russia's failure to abide by the agreement was "deepening its isolation". On 6 September 2008, Dick Cheney spoke of Russia's "brutality" in reasserting itself. On 9 September 2008, Pentagon spokesman Brian Whitman announced that the American military humanitarian operation in Georgia ended. 62 air flights and 3 ship dockings had taken place during the humanitarian operation. On 9 September, Eric S. Edelman, Under Secretary of Defense for Policy, told a Senate Committee on Armed Services that the United States had to "Demonstrate to Russia that its aggressive actions do not serve its national interest, will not be tolerated, and will not be cost free." He stated that the first-ever invasion by post-Soviet Russia was "a chilling message" of "a new aggressiveness," indicating that Russia was willing to resort to military means to attain its objectives. Edelman stated that the Department of Defense would assess Georgia's needs and then the United States would assess options for rebuilding the Georgian military. On 9 September, chair of the United States House Committee on Foreign Affairs, Howard Berman, stated at a hearing of the House Committee on Foreign Affairs that Russian president Medvedev's recent remarks on Saakashvili indicated that Russian attempts to remove the Georgian government continued. He asked, "How should we reassess US-Russian relations in the aftermath of Russia's use of disproportionate force against its sovereign neighbor?" Michael McFaul stated that "the danger of a proxy conflict between the East and West escalating into a nuclear holocaust has diminished substantially." He went on to say, "Instead of business as usual or isolation, the United States must navigate a third, more nuanced, more complicated, and more comprehensive strategy that seeks to bolster our allies and partners, check Russian aggression, and at the same time deal directly with the Russian government on issues of mutual interest." On 9 September, Assistant Secretary of State for European and Eurasian Affairs Daniel Fried said in a hearing of the House Committee on Foreign Affairs, "Finally, our strategic response must include the longer-term consequences of the invasion of Georgia for our relationship with Russia. Since 1991, three U.S. administrations have based policy toward Russia on the assumption that Russia – perhaps in fits and starts, imperfectly and in its own way – sought to become a nation integrated with the world: a “normal nation,” that is, part of the international system and its institutions. [...] But with its invasion of Georgia, its continuing refusal to implement the Ceasefire it has signed, and its apparent claim to a “sphere of influence,” Russia has put these assumptions under question and these aspirations at risk." Congressman Brad Sherman said that Georgia's neighbor Armenia had also suffered from the conflict and proposed financial aid for Armenia. On 10 September 2008, Kurt Volker, United States Permanent Representative to NATO, stated, "It has now been four weeks since Russia first promised on August 12 to implement the cease-fire and to withdraw its forces. We still haven't seen it yet." He further stated, "The agreement reached on August 12 says that the Russians need to withdraw to the positions before August 6. That means that they would have some troops in South Ossetia and in Abkhazia, but they would not have combat forces, and they would be at the level that was pertaining at that time." On 11 September 2008, some representatives in the United States Congress questioned the US support of Georgia, with Hillary Clinton saying that it was not "smart" to punish Russia. On 11 September 2008, Republican candidate for Vice President of the United States Sarah Palin said that the US had "to keep an eye on Russia" due to the Russian invasion of Georgia. She added that the United States would not "repeat a Cold War", but she still supported NATO membership for Ukraine and Georgia. When a journalist asked whether Georgia was worthy to be defended against a new Russian invasion, Palin responded that "smaller democratic countries that are invaded by a larger power is something for us to be vigilant against." On 18 September 2008, the U.S. Secretary of State, Condoleezza Rice, said at the German Marshall Fund in Washington that Russia was violating the ceasefire agreement. Rice said that Russia's "deeply disconcerting" attempt to "dismember" Georgia was a part of "a worsening pattern of behavior", and this signaled that Russia was becoming "increasingly authoritarian at home and aggressive abroad." Rice stated that "Russia's behavior cannot be blamed either on NATO enlargement." She further stated that it "has become clear" that "the legitimate goal of rebuilding the Russian state has taken a dark turn" and the decisions of the Russian leadership "could put Russia on a one-way path to self-imposed isolation and international irrelevance." Rice said that the West "must stand up" to "the prejudices that some Russian leaders seem to have: that if you press free nations hard enough – if you bully them, and you threaten them, and you lash out – they will cave in, and they'll forget, and eventually they will concede." Rice pledged that the West "must not allow Russia's aggression to achieve any benefit" and would aid the reconstruction of Georgia. Rice stated that the West "will not allow Russia to wield a veto over the future of the Euro-Atlantic community – neither what states are offered membership, nor the choice of states that accept it. We have made this particularly clear to our friends in Ukraine." Rice suggested that Russia's future membership of the World Trade Organization had been put in doubt by the Russian leadership's "nostalgia for another time". Rice had notified Russian foreign minister Sergey Lavrov of this speech in advance. Russian Foreign Ministry official Andrey Nesterenko had claimed prior to Rice giving her speech that the US were warming towards Russia and that the new US position had "signs of realism and a balanced approach are now showing". Russian submarine tested an Intercontinental ballistic missile near the Kamchatka Peninsula in few hours following Rice's speech. The United States had halted nuclear cooperation with Russia. Eight US Congressmen submitted a resolution to the House Committee on Foreign Affairs to accelerate Ukraine's admission into NATO in response to the Russian attack on Georgia. On 19 September 2008, Robert Gates declared at the Oxford Analytica: "Russia's current actions – however egregious – do not represent the existential and global threat that the Soviet Union represented. [...] Russia's conventional military remains a shadow of its Soviet predecessor in size and capability." He said the Russian victory over Georgia would be considered a "Pyrrhic victory". Assistant Secretary of State Daniel Fried stated that the US would cooperate with the EU against Russia. Some members of the United States House of Representatives proposed canceling Russia's right to host the Winter Olympics in Sochi. Czech Foreign Minister Karel Schwarzenberg had already proposed in August 2008 to boycott the Olympic games in Russia. On 22 September 2008, the Los Angeles Times reported that US officials were still divided over whether to resume cooperation with Russia. On 23 September 2008, President Bush said in his address to the United Nations General Assembly that Russia broke the UN principle on "equal rights of nations large and small" and the international community wanted "to see how we respond to this test". In response, Russian foreign minister Sergey Lavrov said that "nothing new" was said and as a whole, the address was "effective". A group of retired American and Russian diplomats issued a joint statement expressing their concern over the worsening relations between the USA and Russia. On 25 September 2008, Condoleezza Rice met with Sergey Lavrov in New York City for the first time since Russia's invasion of Georgia and had a tense discussion about Russia's recognition of Abkhazia and South Ossetia. President Bush met with Georgian president Saakashvili. On 26 September 2008, in response to Medvedev's announcement to revamp the Russian military and strengthen nuclear capabilities following the war with Georgia, Condoleezza Rice said that the United States was not concerned: "The balance of power in terms of nuclear deterrence is not going to be affected by those measures." John McCain and Barack Obama had their first debate in Mississippi. McCain said that Obama had a "naive" position on the Russian invasion. Both McCain and Obama agreed that Georgia should become a NATO member. McCain recalled his visit to a separatist region of Georgia before the war and seeing the banner of President Vladimir Putin there, further adding that Russia was "just waiting to seize the opportunity". Obama responded that he had already warned in April 2008 to replace Russian peacekeepers in Georgia with an international contingent. On 9 October 2008, Secretary of Defense Robert Gates met with Georgian Defense Minister Davit Kezerashvili in Budapest and discussed military assistance to Georgia. Gates called on the NATO members to support MAP for Georgia at the December summit. On 13 October 2008, George Bush suggested during his meeting with Italian prime minister Silvio Berlusconi in Washington that Russia could gain international respect if it returned Abkhazia and South Ossetia to Georgia. The situation in Georgia was the main topic of a meeting between Howard Berman, chair of the House Committee on Foreign Affairs, and members of the Russian State Duma Committee on International Affairs in Moscow on 14 October 2008. On 20 October 2008, John Bolton warned that "If Moscow's marching through Georgia goes unopposed, marching will look more attractive elsewhere, starting with Ukraine, which has a large ethnic Russian population". On 21 October 2008, Chairman of the Joint Chiefs of Staff Michael Mullen met with Russian counterpart Nikolay Yegorovich Makarov in Helsinki at the Russian initiative and discussed the August war and NATO-Russia relations. This was the first meeting between high-ranking military officials of the two countries since August 2008. Mullen then Visited Latvia and Lithuania to assure them of the US support in the face of a Russian threat. Pavel Felgenhauer commented on the meeting in Finland that the sides did not reach an agreement. On 21 October 2008, Sarah Palin warned that the election of Barack Obama would cause a new conflict involving Russia: "After the Russian Army invaded the nation of Georgia, Senator Obama's reaction was one of indecision and moral equivalence, the kind of response that would only encourage Russia's Putin to invade Ukraine next." On 7 November 2008, former U.S. ambassadors to Georgia William Courtney and Kenneth Yalowitz, and former European Commission ambassador to Georgia Denis Corboy, wrote: "Moscow is going out of its way to signal that Ukraine is the next target. [...] Isolating Russia or keeping it permanently at arm's length would be a historic error." On 17 November 2008, President-Elect Barack Obama called Georgian president Saakashvili and expressed support for Georgia's territorial integrity. Elected Vice-President Joe Biden also spoke with Saakashvili. On 21 November 2008, $250 million in financial aid for Georgia was transferred by the United States. On 23 November 2008, President Bush met with Russian counterpart Medvedev in Peru for the first time since August 2008 and discussed "differences on Georgia". Russia was waiting for Barack Obama's victory in the 2008 United States presidential election in November 2008. In contrast to the Bush administration, Barack Obama's administration launched a policy of appeasement to Russia and imposed an arms embargo against Georgia, thus encouraging Russia to attack Ukraine in 2014. On 27 January 2009, Robert Gates commented on Russia-Venezuela naval exercises that he would have personally invited the Russians into Miami if the August war had not happened. On 7 February 2009, US Vice-President Joe Biden stated at the Munich Security Conference that although the US would not recognize neither Georgia's separatists regions nor Russian spheres of influences, the US still would cooperate with Russia "where our interests coincide". On 12 February 2009, Director of National Intelligence Dennis C. Blair said that although Russia signaled willingness to improve relations, Russia's conflict with NATO and Georgia "will continue to pose difficulties for the relationship". In March 2009, Supreme Allied Commander Europe Bantz J. Craddock stated that relations with Russia were the worst since the end of the Cold War and Russia's actions against Georgia and Ukraine were aimed at reducing the US influence in the region. In early 2010, a book was published revealing that although the Bush administration had considered a military response to defend Georgia, it decided against it to avoid provoking a conflict with Russia. Instead, the US sent humanitarian aid to Georgia on military aircraft. In May 2010, Senator John McCain blasted President Obama for discarding Georgia and instead pursuing cooperation with Russia, echoing the sentiments among the US political experts. Obama's advisor Michael McFaul stated that although the "reset" policy was successful in solving some international issues together with Russia, Georgia was still a contested topic. In late 2010, WikiLeaks revealed that the US Ambassador to Russia, John Beyrle, had advised the US government in June 2009 against military cooperation with Georgia since it would harm "re-start relations with Russia." The Times reported in 2015 that during the Russian 2008 invasion of Georgia, the US administration discussed sanctions against Russia, but did not implement them due to their possible effect on the world economy.
Uruguay	The Uruguayan Ministry of Foreign Relations called for "respect for sovereignty, territorial integrity and respect for human rights to reach a peaceful solution in accord with the principles of International Law."
Vatican City	On 10 August, Pope Benedict XVI expressed his hope that "military action will stop immediately and that they will abstain, in the name of their common Christian inheritance, from further clashes and violence." He called on the international community to find "a peaceful and lasting solution." Pope welcomed the ceasefire agreement by 17 August.
Venezuela	On 14 August, the Venezuelan government stated that they followed with concern "the increase in unacceptable acts of violence perpetrated by the Georgian troops against the South Ossetian population" and that the conflict was "planned, set and ordered by the United States government". It claimed that Russian forces acted according to international treaties to preserve the lives of South Ossetians and Russians. It celebrated the steps done in favor of "restoration of peace" and warned European countries to "not allow external actors putting at risk the stability of European continent and world peace". By early September 2008, President Hugo Chávez supported the Russian recognition of Abkhazia and South Ossetia, saying that Venezuela "would do the same if someone dared to attack us." He labeled Georgia president Saakashvili as a "puppet".
Vietnam	On 28 August 2008, Foreign Ministry spokesman Le Dung stated, "Our persistent policy is to promote settlement of international disputes through peaceful solutions in line with international laws and the United Nations' Charter." In March 2010, President of Vietnam Nguyễn Minh Triết declared during his meeting with Anatoliy Serdyukov, Russian Defense Minister, in Hanoi, "Each of Russia's victories is like our own, and we support Russia in the Georgian conflict."

== States with limited recognition and non-state entities ==
Entity	Response
Abkhazia	On 5 August, foreign minister of the self-proclaimed Republic of Abkhazia, Sergey Shamba, announced that Abkhazia's army might open a second front against Georgia if a war would break out in South Ossetia.
Caucasus Emirate	On 9 August, Movladi Udugov, rebel spokesman for the Caucasus Emirate, stated that the Caucasus Emirate had been monitoring Georgia-Russia relations since February 2008 and the Emirate was tracking the movement of Russian forces in the North Caucasus even before the conflict and that Udugov "would like also to remind that our secret service had warned that Russia planned to start war against Georgia in August." Udugov stated, "For the time being, neither Tbilisi nor Washington have appealed to us with any requests or offers" to fight alongside Georgian forces.
Chechen Republic of Ichkeria	Usman Ferzauli, the foreign minister of the self-proclaimed Chechen Republic of Ichkeria, stated on 9 August that there was no justification for the Russian aggression and that the leadership of Ichkeria had been repeatedly warning about Russia's plans for annexing the territories of neighboring countries. Ferzauli called on the international community to halt Russia's aggression against Georgia, stating, "Based on this alarming situation, the leadership of the CRI calls on all peace-loving countries to show integrity and, by curbing the aggressor, to prevent the escalation of military conflict."
Don Cossacks	On 8 August, Viktor Vodolatskiy, the ataman of the Don Cossacks Host, announced that a "volunteer 429th independent motor rifle regiment" would be created to help South Ossetia. By 9 August, at least 100 Cossack volunteers had left the North Caucasus to fight Georgia.
Hamas	Khaled Mashal, leader of Hamas, declared that Hamas supported Russia.
Kosovo	President of Kosovo Fatmir Sejdiu said in late August 2008 that Kosovo cannot serve as an example for Russia to recognise South Ossetia or Abkhazia. He said that "Kosovo has special characteristics. That it is sui generis and it cannot be used as a precedent for other conflict zones, areas or regions." He said that Kosovo was "on the side of great world powers".
Kuban Cossacks	The Kuban Cossacks, according to Khariton Yedziyev, expressed their readiness on 8 August to help the defence of South Ossetia.
Nagorno-Karabakh Republic	Several non-governmental organizations released a joint statement on 8 August: "We consider the effort to solve any conflict by force absolutely unacceptable, and we call on the government of Georgia to immediately stop the fighting, which has already brought about numerous casualties among the peaceful population of South Ossetia."
North Ossetia-Alania	North Ossetian president Taimuraz Mamsurov stated on early 8 August that "hundreds of volunteers are on their way to South Ossetia. We are unable to stop them or to prevent them from going."
Terek Cossacks	On the morning of 8 August, Khariton Yedziyev, the ataman of the Terek Cossacks of North Ossetia, said that part of his regiment was already fighting in South Ossetia against Georgia. Yedziyev stated that the Cossacks of North Ossetia were forming volunteer units.
Transnistria	On 8 August, the separatist republic's Foreign Ministry said that they viewed Georgian military action as "the act of aggression against a free democratic nation, the peaceful residents of South Ossetia." The statement further said, "It is very clear already that the Georgian government doesn't understand any logic but the logic of bloodshed and violent solution of the conflict. [...] We don't rule out that the government of PMR won't prevent volunteers to travel to the Republic of South Ossetia." On 12 August 2008, Transnistria froze all contacts with the central government of Moldova until the latter condemned the "Georgian aggression". 14 August 2008 was declared as a National day of mourning for the South Ossetian victims of the war.

== Joint statements ==
Countries	Response
Estonia; Latvia; Lithuania	On 10 August, Ene Ergma, Gundars Daudze and Česlovas Juršėnas, the presidents of the parliaments of the Baltic states – Estonia, Latvia and Lithuania – issued a joint declaration: "We are calling on the international community to decisively condemn actions of Russia and to promptly take all necessary steps to stop the war and bring the parties to the negotiation table. Justification of Russia's actions in Georgia by the need to protect its citizens is unacceptable. Alleged reasons for taking up a war against Georgia raise concerns about the future in every state with Russian citizens living on its territory. We are concerned and disappointed with the actions and behaviour of Russia, as an important actor in the politics of the region and the whole world, which will inevitably have effect on further bilateral and multilateral relations with this country. Russia's military aggression against another sovereign state and actions contradicting the statements of its leaders raise serious doubts about the reliability and consistency of Russia as a partner."
Estonia; Latvia; Lithuania; Poland	Toomas Hendrik Ilves, Valdis Zatlers, Valdas Adamkus and Lech Kaczyński, respectively the Presidents of Estonia, Latvia, Lithuania and Poland, issued a joint declaration stating, "We strongly condemn the actions by the Russian military forces against the sovereign and independent country of Georgia. Following the unilateral military actions of the Russian military forces, we will use all means available to us as Presidents to ensure that aggression against a small country in Europe will not be passed over in silence or with meaningless statements equating the victims with the victimizers." They further stated, "The EU and NATO must take the initiative and stand-up against the spread of imperialist and revisionist policy in the East of Europe. New international peacekeeping forces should be created as the current setting proved to be ineffective. We regret that not granting of the NATO's Membership Action Plan (MAP) to Georgia was seen as a green light for aggression in the region." The heads of these states arrived in Georgia on 12 August. Adamkus invoked the memories of Hitler and said that the European foreign ministers must make "a proper assessment of the aggression against Georgia" by supporting Georgia. Kaczynski said that "our biggest ally [the United States] has to confirm its strong support" in Georgia. Ilves stated that the conflict was "a touchstone [...] for shaping European security policies in the future." Prime Minister of Latvia Ivars Godmanis said that Georgia's territorial integrity should not be sacrificed in search of the end of the war.
Estonia; Latvia; Lithuania; Poland; Ukraine	Ilves, Adamkus, Kaczyński, Viktor Yushchenko and Ivars Godmanis, respectively the Presidents of Estonia, Lithuania, Poland, Ukraine and Prime Minister of Latvia, jointly visited Tbilisi in support of Georgia on 12 August 2008. All five states had previously been satellite states, occupied by and/or annexed by the Soviet Union.
USA; UK; Canada; France; Germany; Italy; Japan	On 20 August 2008, G7 foreign ministers promised financial aid for Georgia. In late August 2008, the foreign ministers issued a statement condemning Russia's "excessive use of military force". The British Foreign Office called the statement an "unprecedented step". The statement said, "We ... condemn the action of our fellow G8 member. Russia's recognition of the independence of South Ossetia and Abkhazia violates the territorial integrity and sovereignty of Georgia and is contrary to UN Security Council resolutions supported by Russia."
Estonia; Latvia; Lithuania; Finland; Denmark; Norway; Sweden; Iceland	The foreign ministers of the Baltic countries and Scandinavia met in Pärnu on 10 September 2008 and stated that Russia violated the international law and could no longer serve as peacekeeper in the Caucasus. The Foreign Ministers noted, "Everything must be done to provide the Eastern neighbors with a transatlantic perspective so that Georgia's scenario does not repeat itself in the future."

== International organisations ==
Organisation	Response
Collective Security Treaty Organisation	The member states endorsed a Russian initiative to impose an arms embargo on Georgia during the meeting on 2 September in Yerevan. Secretary General of the Collective Security Treaty Organisation Nikolai Bordyuzha claimed that "What is happening after the conflict … is certainly driving South Ossetia and Abkhazia into the collective security system," and further stated that "South Ossetia and Abkhazia can not successfully and steadily develop without [being part of] a collective security system, without the backing of other states." The ministers of the CSTO (ODKB) held a meeting in Moscow on 4 September. A final statement was issued after the meeting. The ministers were "deeply concerned about Georgia's military activities in South Ossetia, which led to multiple civilian casualties ... and a major humanitarian catastrophe." The statement said, "The events around South Ossetia showed the danger of double standards in international relations." However, the CSTO meeting did not recognise the independence of South Ossetia and Abkhazia. The ministers decided that the Medvedev-Sarkozy agreement was necessary "to thwart new attempts to use force in settling the conflict and securing peace and stability in the region." Armenian foreign minister Edvard Nalbandyan said, "We have come out with support for Russia's active role in contributing to peace and cooperation in the region." Member of the State Duma Konstantin Zatulin suggested that Russia would work at the follow-up meeting to convey all Russian positions to the CSTO leaders.
Parliamentary Assembly of the Council of Europe	On 11 August 2008, Terry Davis, the Secretary General of the Council of Europe, Swedish foreign minister Carl Bildt and US diplomat Matthew Bryza arrived in Tbilisi and met with Georgian foreign minister Eka Tkeshelashvili. Davis declared that he aimed to collect information, and the Parliamentary Assembly of the Council of Europe (PACE) would respond to the crisis. In mid-September 2008, 24 delegates requested to review the credentials of the Russian delegation. In response, Russia threatened to leave the Council of Europe. Nine members of the PACE would visit Moscow, Tbilisi, and Tskhinvali on 22–25 September. On 24 September 2008, foreign ministers of the Council of Europe discussed the war in New York at the initiative of Swedish foreign minister Carl Bildt. Bildt said in his report that Georgian military action was not "aggression towards the Russian Federation". On 25 September, the PACE delegation entered Tskhinvali from the Georgian side. In response, President of South Ossetia Eduard Kokoity said that this was the last time anyone would be admitted from the Georgian border. Later that day, Luc Van den Brande said in Tbilisi that the PACE could not confirm that any genocide had taken place in South Ossetia. Instead, the PACE confirmed an ethnic cleansing of Georgians in South Ossetia. The PACE delegation called to ensure law and order in the "buffer zone" bordering South Ossetia. On 30 September 2008, the PACE session discussed the war. Luc Van den Brande stated: "For the first time, there has been a real war between two member countries of the Council of Europe." Other delegates from Switzerland, the United Kingdom, and Hungary reiterated Van den Brande's statement. Mátyás Eörsi asked: "What should the Georgians have done when people in their territory were shelled?" On 1 October 2008, the PACE did not suspend the Russian delegation. On 2 October 2008, the PACE adopted a resolution stating that both Georgia and Russia used disproportionate force. The assembly also urged for an international investigation to determine the causes of the war. Members of the delegation that had visited Tbilisi, Andreas Gross, Luc Van den Brande, and Mátyás Eörsi, gave an interview to Russian Novaya Gazeta and heavily criticized Russia. Eörsi said that the war did not start on 7 August. The delegation of the PACE, headed by Lluís Maria de Puig, arrived in Moscow in January 2009 to check up on the implementation of the assembly's October 2008 resolution.
European Union	In the afternoon of 7 August 2008, the European Commission expressed its concern over the situation in South Ossetia. The EU statement said that High Representative of the Union for Foreign Affairs and Security Policy Javier Solana and Georgian president Saakashvili talked about the situation in South Ossetia by phone by 8 August, "Solana expressed his serious concern about the situation in South Ossetia and called for every effort to be made to rapidly end the violence and resume peaceful talks between the sides." Solana said, "We repeat our message to all parties to immediately stop the violence." Solana was planning to speak with the Russian and Georgian foreign ministers. The EU stated, "The European Union, in liaison with all the protagonists, is working towards a ceasefire so as to avoid an extension of the conflict." The EU was ready to increase its participation in the peace process in partnership with other international parties. France (which held the rotating presidency of the European Union) announced that the EU and the US would send a joint delegation to negotiate a ceasefire. However, an American official said that a US diplomat would visit the region only after hostilities had ceased. EU spokeswoman Christina Gallach said: "We think it is not acceptable to see these scenes of bloodshed and destruction." On 9 August, some European officials stated that the war was the fault of both Georgia and Russia. They said that "finger-pointing was counterproductive". On 9 August, spokeswoman Cristina Gallach said that the current goal was to achieve a ceasefire. She said that European delegates were already traveling to the Caucasus. An anonymous European official said, "The record is crystal clear. Russia has launched a full-scale military operation, on air, land and sea. We have entered a totally new realm — politically, legally, and diplomatically." On the evening of 9 August, the European Union delegation was scheduled to arrive in Georgia. The European delegation included Peter Semneby and Heikki Talvitie among others. On 10 August, an EU source said that an emergency meeting of EU foreign ministers would be convened in Brussels on 13 August. On 11 August, European Commission spokeswoman Krisztina Nagy said in Brussels, "We consider that the latest developments, such as the crossing of the Georgian borders by Russian troops, changed the dimension of the conflict." On 13 August, the EU foreign ministers met in Brussels and proposed that, in the event of a UN resolution, EU peacekeepers would be deployed to the conflict zone. French foreign minister Bernard Kouchner said, "We are determined to act on the ground." High Representative for the Common Foreign and Security Policy Javier Solana said the EU sought to supply humanitarian assistance and facilitate the reconstruction as soon as possible. France wished its peace deal to get approved by the meeting before it would be presented to the UN Security Council. The EU ministers wished to discuss how to defend humanitarian aid. The statement said that Georgia's territorial integrity would form a basis for any future peace agreement. European officials believed that an expectation of Russian future sway over Abkhazia and South Ossetia would be "realistic". On 14 August, Reuters reported that a member of the European Commission said that the war had ended the possibility of fresh relations between the EU and Russia since the war "has ended Medvedev's honeymoon with the West. It's clear that Putin, not Medvedev, is in charge." On 20 August, Member of the European Parliament Elmar Brok said that after Georgia, Russia could create instability in Azerbaijan or Ukraine. France convened 27 EU countries to meet in Brussels to discuss the EU's reaction to the Russo-Georgian war. According to the French foreign minister Bernard Kouchner, some countries asked to impose sanctions on Russia. The criticism of Russia increased since its recognition of the independence of Abkhazia and South Ossetia. On 1 September, a 150-minute meeting was planned in Brussels to discuss the war in Georgia. Swedish foreign minister Carl Bildt had commented on the convention of meeting that "This happens extremely rarely, to my knowledge only once before in modern times, in 2003, for the Iraq war," adding "It shows the magnitude of the event. ... This five-day war (in Georgia) has changed Europe profoundly." Before the meeting, there were already differing opinions among the EU leaders on how to penalize Russia. Baltic countries pushed to delay the September 15–16 talks on a future EU-Russia partnership agreement. Gordon Brown had said, "The EU should review - root and branch - our relationship with Russia." German foreign minister Steinmeier said "the recipes of the Cold War" would make it difficult to force Russia to comply with the ceasefire and finish withdrawal from Georgia. France did not support punishing Russia. The energy policies of some European countries made it difficult for them to take any serious action against Russia. Sanctions were not imposed on Russia. On 3 September 2008, the Budget Committee of the European Parliament proposed to freeze €60.5 million financial aid for Russia in 2009. On 5 September, the EU members proposed an international investigation to find the responsible party for the Russo-Georgian war during the meeting in France. European countries began searching for alternatives to energy routes from Russia. Presidents of Poland, Czechia, Slovakia, and Hungary met in Slovakia to discuss the EU dependence on Russian supplies and the construction of the Nabucco pipeline. On 15 September, the European Union announced a €500 million grant to Georgia. Commissioner Benita Ferrero-Waldner said the financial aid would serve humanitarian and reconstruction purposes. The EU-Russia relations got back to normal when a conference was held in Évian-les-Bains, France, on 8 October 2008. Russian president Medvedev said during his meeting with Sarkozy, "The events in the Caucasus have merely confirmed the absolute correctness of the idea of a new European Security Treaty." Sarkozy said that the Russian president's fulfillment of his promise on the withdrawal from the "buffer zones" was a positive contribution to the EU-Russia relations. On 13 October 2008, the EU foreign ministers met in Luxembourg. Swedish and Danish foreign ministers criticized Russia for not reducing its military presence in South Ossetia and Abkhazia. The meeting approved of Russia's withdrawal from the buffer zones in Georgia, but still decided to defer restarting of dealings with Russia because Russia had not completely pulled out to pre-war positions from Kodori and Akhalgori. European Commissioner for External Relations Benita Ferrero-Waldner announced that a donors' conference on Georgia would be held in Brussels on 22 October 2008. On 3 November 2008, Polish and Lithuanian presidents stated that they were against resuming the EU dialogue on partnership cooperation with Russia because the Russian forces were remaining in Abkhazia and South Ossetia in violation of the ceasefire agreement. An EU diplomat was quoted as saying that although "legally there is no reason to relaunch the talks", Europe's financial and security necessities "dictates that we need to communicate with Russia." Before the start of the EU foreign ministers' summit on 10 November 2008, British and Swedish foreign ministers issued a statement supporting the resumption of dialogue with Russia. After the meeting, the EU released a statement saying that restarting dialogue with Russia "no way legitimise the status quo in Georgia, or Russian action contrary to our values and principles." Polish foreign minister Radosław Sikorski also supported dialogue with Russia. Prime Minister of Poland Donald Tusk supported the EU dialogue with Russia. On 14 November 2008, Sarkozy met with Russian president Dmitry Medvedev at the EU-Russia summit in Nice and announced that Russia had "largely implemented" the ceasefire agreement. Medvedev said that Russia recognized Georgia's territorial integrity without Abkhazia and South Ossetia. President of the European Commission José Manuel Barroso stated that partnership negotiations with Russia would be reopened. The United States Department of State warned against resuming talks until Russia withdraws completely from Georgian territory. In late November 2008, a draft document of the European Commission was leaked. The document stated: "The conflict in Georgia in August 2008 and its broader repercussions have resulted in increased awareness of the vulnerability of Eastern partners." The Commission was considering the European Union Association Agreements with six former Soviet countries. In December 2010, WikiLeaks revealed that during the war, the EU was divided into two camps: "Russia-friendly" and "Russia-hostile". Germans were "parroting" the Russian position. Latvia pushed for NATO to give weapons to Georgia. Countries such as the Czech Republic, Estonia, Latvia, Lithuania, Poland, and the UK were critical of Russia. Countries such as France, Germany, Greece, Italy, and the Netherlands supported Russia. One European diplomat revealed that many European countries were not pleased with the ceasefire agreement prepared by Sarkozy. Franciszek Gągor, chief of Polish General Staff, asserted that there were possible Russian spies in the inner circle of Georgian president Saakashvili.
NATO	In the afternoon of 7 August 2008, NATO called on the Georgian and South Ossetian sides to restrain themselves from resorting to violence. NATO's official website posted the following statement from the NATO Secretary General on 8 August 2008, "The NATO Secretary General, Jaap de Hoop Scheffer, is seriously concerned about the events that are taking place in the Georgian region of South Ossetia and said that the Alliance is closely following the situation. The Secretary General calls on all sides for an immediate end to the armed clashes and direct talks between the parties." NATO spokesman Carmen Romero said NATO maintained contact with the leaders of Georgia and Russia. Former US ambassador to NATO Robert E. Hunter said: "No one (within NATO) wants to fight for Georgia ... They see it as being too far away." The BBC wrote on 10 August that "emissaries from [...] Nato members are hardly likely to be seen as honest brokers by the Kremlin, when it comes to Georgia." On 11 August, a NATO spokesman said that Scheffer was "seriously concerned about the disproportionate use of force by the Russians and the lack of respect for the territorial integrity of Georgia." Spokesman further said, "The military operations that we saw on Saturday and since then, including air and missile attacks, have no relation to and go well beyond the CIS peacekeeping operation." After 26 NATO ambassadors had met the Georgian ambassador on 12 August, Secretary General Jaap de Hoop Scheffer said that ambassadors supported Georgia "in very strong terms" and "condemned and deplored (Russia's) excessive, disproportionate use of force" against "a friend ... and a highly respected partner of NATO." Scheffer said that Russian announcement to halt its operation was positive news, but "not enough". Scheffer stated, "Abkhazia and Ossetia, if I mention territorial integrity, are to the best of my knowledge part of Georgia." He further stated that "Nato is not seeking a direct role or a military role in this conflict". NATO stated that Georgia would still join NATO. Scheffer told a news conference, "I think that the Bucharest communique stands. And no ally will do anything away from the Bucharest declaration ... That situation has not changed." Scheffer said that the prospect for Georgia joining NATO was still "very much alive". Scheffer said that a future NATO-Russia Council meeting had to be "properly prepared." Anonymous German and French diplomats, whose countries were spearheading diplomatic attempts to resolve the crisis, stated that the war significantly lowered the probability of Georgia's membership. On 14 August 2008, the NATO barred Russian ship from participation in the naval exercises in the Mediterranean Sea in response to the Russian invasion of Georgia. On 19 August, British Foreign Secretary David Miliband said, "The Nato membership was clear that Russia had violated international laws as well as the rules of the international game." He said that Russia's failure to withdraw from Georgia helped reach a consensus at the NATO meeting and that NATO would provide fresh support to Georgia. Miliband also said, "I am not one that believes that isolating Russia is the right answer to its misdemeanour. I think the right answer is hard-headed dialogue." The United States had pushed for more serious punishment at the NATO meeting. After the meeting, held at Condoleezza Rice's initiative, the statement of the ministers was issued, which said Russian action was "inconsistent with its peacekeeping role" and international treaties. NATO Secretary General Jaap de Hoop Scheffer said, "There can be no business as usual with Russia under present circumstances. And the future of our relations will depend on the concrete actions Russia will take to honour the words of President Medvedev, to abide by the six-point peace plan, which is not happening at the moment, which is not happening as we speak." Scheffer further said, "the Alliance is considering seriously the implications of Russia's actions for the NATO-Russia relationship." NATO froze official ties with Russia, and NATO would not hold any new joint NATO-Russia gatherings before the pullout of the Russian army from Georgia. However, NATO did not undertake enduring punitive measures against Russia because of Europe's energy policy. NATO ministers agreed to set up a NATO-Georgia Commission that would be in charge of the relations between the NATO and Georgia. Scheffer stated that "Russian forces should go back to their positions on the 6th of August." 50 NATO experts would visit Georgia to review the situation on the ground. Dmitry Rogozin, Russian envoy to NATO, called the meeting a "mountain that gave birth to a mouse", adding, "All of these threats that have been raining down on Russia turned out to be empty words." In response to NATO, Russia did not participate in a joint exercise in the Baltic Sea. Russia did not admit American naval vessel near the Kamchatka Peninsula. NATO representative Carmen Romero said on 21 August 2008 that NATO had received a note from Russia that Russia was halting cooperation with NATO. On 27 August, a spokesman for the Supreme Headquarters Allied Powers Europe, Lieutenant Colonel Web Wright, said that four NATO vessels were participating in an exercise in the Black Sea. However, he added, "Obviously, there are other NATO-affiliated nations out doing things. But I can't speak for those nations." On 8 September, a NATO delegation was scheduled to arrive in Georgia to assess the extent of the military destruction. On 15 September 2008, Secretary General Jaap de Hoop Scheffer said before he arrived in Georgia that NATO would tell both the Georgian government and opposition to "strengthen democracy". He told the Financial Times that it was "difficult to swallow" the new reality on the ground, "If the Russians are staying in South Ossetia with so many forces, I do not consider this as a return to the status quo." Scheffer said at the first gathering of the NATO-Georgia Commission in Tbilisi that Georgia's accession to NATO would be "accelerated", but he did not set any specific date. Scheffer declared, "Russia's use of force was disproportionate, and Russia must now comply with all elements of the six-point plan. At the same time, despite the difficult situation, we expect Georgia to firmly stay the course of democracy and reform." In response to the NATO meeting in Tbilisi, the Russian Foreign Ministry accused NATO of encouraging Georgia to undertake "new adventures" and criticized NATO Secretary-General for visiting Gori, Georgia. Russian ambassador to NATO Dmitry Rogozin said that granting MAP to Georgia could lead to the NATO-Russia war. United States Secretary of Defense Robert Gates commented on NATO members' attitude towards Russia in detail on 18 September 2008. Russian ambassador to Afghanistan suggested that Russian air space would be closed for NATO transit to Afghanistan by saying that Russia's air space was "still open, but if the NATO countries continue with their hostile policies with regard to Russia, definitely this issue will happen." Before the start of a meeting in London on 19 September, Gates told Sky News that new Russian attack on Georgia after joining NATO would cause an American military response. On 19 September 2008, NATO would discuss the creation of the Rapid reaction forces to be deployed in member countries bordering Russia to defend them from Russian invasion. On 10 October 2008, the first meeting of the NATO-Georgia council was held in Budapest. At the NATO Parliamentary Assembly session in Valencia on 18 November 2008, Jaap de Hoop Scheffer stated: "Trustful NATO-Russia relations are a strategic asset – a boon to European and indeed global security. That is why the key tenets of our Russia policy – a policy of constructive engagement – will remain. After the Caucasus conflict, there can be no business as usual with Russia, and we need to seriously review our relationship." The PA adopted a resolution supporting an international investigation of the causes of the war. On 2 December 2008, Jaap De Hoop Scheffer announced after the foreign ministers' meeting in Brussels that "Allies agreed on what I would qualify as a conditional and graduated reengagement with Russia," but clarified that NATO still disapproved of the Russian actions in Georgia. United States Secretary of State Condoleezza Rice cautioned NATO against cooperation with Russia unless Russia fulfilled its obligations regarding Georgia. The ministers adopted a communique stating that NATO would increase cooperation with Georgia via Georgia-NATO commission. Scheffer told The New York Times that NATO wanted to establish "what was behind Georgia" and convince Russia that "democracy and the rule of law coming closer to Russia's borders" was not a threat to Russia. On 19 December 2008, Jaap De Hoop Scheffer and Dmitry Rogozin had a joint lunch in Brussels to normalize relations in the aftermath of the war. On 7 February 2009, Jaap De Hoop Scheffer stated in Munich: "President Medvedev has also proposed a discussion of a new Euro-Atlantic security architecture. [...] But I cannot see how we can have a serious discussion of such a new architecture, in which President Medvedev himself says “territorial integrity” is a primary element, when Russia is building bases inside Georgia, which doesn't want them." On 13 January 2009, Russian General Anatoliy Nogovitsyn announced that Russia was ready to resume cooperation with NATO if the United States apologized for the break in relations. On 30 January 2009, NATO Press-speaker James Appathurai said that the NATO General Secretary would raise the issue of Russian military bases in Abkhazia and South Ossetia with First Deputy Prime Minister of Russia in Munich. On 19 February 2009, Jaap De Hoop Scheffer said in Kraków: "The conflict in the Caucasus convinced some that good relations with Russia and the further expansion of NATO are mutually excluded. This is not so." Scheffer announced that NATO would consider Russia's concerns during future expansions. NATO foreign ministers met in Brussels on 5 March 2009 and decided to renew contacts with Russia in the framework of NATO-Russia Council. Lithuania and Czechia were against resuming ties with Russia too soon before Russia would allow international monitors into Abkhazia and South Ossetia. Secretary of State Hillary Clinton urged the NATO countries to never recognize Abkhazia and South Ossetia. NATO Summit on 4 April 2009 called on Russia "to meet its commitments with respect to Georgia, as mediated by the European Union on 12 August and 8 September 2008", in particular to withdraw completely from Georgia and annul the recognition of Abkhazia and South Ossetia. The declaration also stated: "We are deeply concerned that, since 12 December 2007, Russia has continued its unilateral "suspension" of its legal obligations under the CFE Treaty. Furthermore, Russia's actions in Georgia have called into question its commitment to the fundamental OSCE principles". Russian foreign minister and NATO foreign ministers met on Corfu on 27 June 2009. They decided to renew cooperation despite some disagreements over Georgia.
Organization for Security and Co-operation in Europe	On 2 August 2008, chairman of the OSCE, Finnish Foreign Minister Alexander Stubb, condemned "this needless violence, especially against civilian targets" during the night of 2 August and urged all sides to de-escalate. On 7 August 2008, Alexander Stubb expressed concern about the deteriorating situation in the Georgian-Ossetian conflict zone and that the scheduled meeting between representatives of Georgia and South Ossetia had not taken place. Stubb said that he would visit Georgia soon. In the afternoon of 8 August, the Permanent Council of OSCE was convened in Vienna. Finnish foreign minister Alexander Stubb said that the fighting might grow into "a full-fledged war," which "would have a devastating impact for the entire region." Alexander Stubb said on August 9, "Russia is at the moment a party in this conflict, not a mediator, and that has to be mirrored when ceasefire and peace talks begin. It is clear that there is no return to the status quo, to what was." Stubb was planning to visit Georgia on 11 August and Russia on 12 August. He commented on the possibility of a swift end of the crisis, "On a scale of one to 10, we are at about two." Stubb further commented on the conflict, "This is a war, no doubt about it. There is no reason to call it anything else." On the morning of 12 August, the OSCE head said he was "carefully optimistic" that Russia would accept the joint EU-OSCE ceasefire draft. Georgian president Saakashvili had already accepted the plan. Russia was refusing to accept a ceasefire offered by Georgia. The Finnish foreign minister, Alexander Stubb, acting as the chairman of the organisation, travelled to Moscow on 12 August to negotiate a cease-fire. Stubb stated that the OSCE was the only organisation with infrastructure in the area and military observers. During the meeting in Vienna on 13 August, all 56 member states supported the plan to send 100 military observers. The head of the OSCE announced that Russia would permit the deployment of 20 additional monitors to Georgia. Stubb said on 26 August that Russian recognition of Georgia's separatist regions "violates the core principles of the OSCE." He further said: "Russia must immediately pull back its troops from Georgia's territory and implement the cease-fire agreement." After the war, Russia did not readmit the OSCE monitors into South Ossetia, and the OSCE did not manage to evaluate the destruction or facilitate the return of the Georgian displaced persons to South Ossetia. The OSCE halted negotiations with Russia over the deployment of monitors to South Ossetia in September 2008. As of 18 September 2008, 28 monitors were present in the security area adjacent to South Ossetia. Although chairman of the OSCE council Antti Turunen said further negotiations were pointless, Russian envoy Anvar Azimov said Russia was "keeping the door open, ready to continue the dialogue. No doubt we will find a constructive solution." On 29 September 2008, Alexander Stubb said that he was not interested in who started the war. He said that Europe was interested in European Russia and not in isolating Russia. On 4 December 2008, the OSCE foreign ministers met in Helsinki to discuss the situation in Georgia among other topics. British Foreign Secretary David Miliband said that admission of the OSCE monitors into South Ossetia was important and Russia's use of force was "disproportionate". French foreign minister Bernard Kouchner condemned the Russian recognition of Abkhazia and South Ossetia. Secretary General Marc Perrin de Brichambaut said that OSCE was warning about the escalation of tensions before the war. The next day, Russian foreign minister Sergey Lavrov criticized the OSCE. The OSCE did not support the Russian initiative on reforming the collective security system in Europe.
Shanghai Cooperation Organisation	A collective statement by the leaders of all members was adopted at the Dushanbe summit on 28 August 2008. Although Russian officials anticipated unconditional backing before the summit, the meeting instead supported the concept of territorial integrity, "The participants [of the SCO summit] underscore the need for respect of the historical and cultural traditions of each country and each people, for efforts aimed at the preservation, under international law, of the unity of a state and its territorial integrity." The SCO states "support the active role of Russia in assisting peace and cooperation in the region." However, "peaceful dialogue" was also important for resolving the conflict, since "Placing the emphasis exclusively on the use of force has no prospects and hinders a comprehensive settlement of local conflicts." China was reserved, since it had its own separatist problem, and one US State Department official commented on the statement: "Clearly there is unhappiness at what Russia did." The SCO states embraced the 12 August six-point ceasefire document at the end of the statement. Kommersant newspaper commented that "Even Russia's traditional allies refused to side with it." Nezavisimaya Gazeta had reported before the summit that China had rejected Russian-proposed wordings, such as "genocide" and "Georgian aggression".
United Nations	On 7 August 2008, UN Secretary General Ban Ki-moon voiced his position over the escalation of violence and called on all sides "to refrain from any action that could further escalate the situation and threaten the stability of the region." On 8 August, an extraordinary meeting of the UN Security Council was scheduled to be held at 07:00 MSK at Russia's initiative. The session was held, but failed to reach an agreement. On 9 August, Edmond Mulet, Assistant Secretary-General for Peacekeeping, stated that the Abkhaz would attack Georgia, "At this point we are particularly concerned that the conflict appears to be spreading beyond South Ossetia into Abkhazia." On 9 August, the UN Secretary-General's office issued a statement saying that Ban Ki-moon urged "all parties to immediately end hostilities and to engage, without delay, in negotiations to achieve a peaceful settlement." By 10 August, António Guterres, the High Commissioner for Refugees, urged that civilians be allowed to leave the conflict zone safely. Guterres said on 11 August: "It is essential that humanitarian agencies be able to reach the affected and the displaced." On 10 August, the UN reported a Russian military buildup in Abkhazia and the bombing of Zugdidi. A UN official said, "The [U.N.] secretary-general is profoundly concerned over mounting tensions in the Abkhaz zone of conflict." By 11 August, the World Food Programme was providing food to uprooted persons. The organization said that the quantity of those in need was "rising by the hour". On 14 August, the Secretary-General's office published a statement in which Ban Ki-moon said it was difficult for UN observers and humanitarian workers to reach civilians in need. He endorsed the ceasefire but also said "that notwithstanding this agreement, violence continues, with civilians bearing the brunt," and called on the sides "to respect and protect civilians in accordance with international humanitarian law and human rights law." UN resident Robert Watkins commented on the humanitarian situation by 15 August, "Paramilitary and criminal groups are taking advantage of the uncertainty and the lack of administration and police. In terms of security, it is very similar to what happened after the invasion of Iraq." UN press secretary said on 15 August 2008 that an attempt by the UN secretary general to reach the president of Russia by phone and discuss the situation in South Ossetia was unsuccessful. According to an anonymous American official, the secretary-general was considering dispatching eminent United Nations representatives to Georgia on 17 August. On 19 August, an extraordinary meeting of the UN Security Council was convened to consider another French proposal for the peace plan. The proposed resolution urged the Russian withdrawal to pre-war positions, but Russia claimed that the agreement authorized the existence of a Russian-operated buffer area in Georgia and that the resolution's support of Georgia's territorial integrity was irrelevant. Vitaly Churkin called the proposal "very strange" and said that discussion of the proposal was "a waste of time." He said, "They can put it to a vote if they want to. We'll see what happens then." On 22 August, António Guterres visited the conflict zone to study the situation on the ground and met with South Ossetian president Eduard Kokoity. On 28 August, the Security Council rejected appeals by Abkhazia and South Ossetia to attend the meeting and deliver a speech. After the meeting, Belgian diplomat Jan Grauls said, "There was no unanimous support to respond positively to these requests now." Russia had previously unsuccessfully lobbied for Abkhazia and South Ossetia to be granted permission to attend Security Council meetings in the preceding months. On 11 September 2008, Ban Ki-Moon said that he was discussing the situation in Georgia daily with international leaders and was working on the deployment of the UN peacekeepers to Abkhazia and South Ossetia. In September 2008, Miguel d'Escoto Brockmann, the president of the UN General Assembly, claimed that Georgia "committed an act of aggression against South Ossetia and violated UN Charter." The United Nations announced that the UN delegation would visit Georgia and Russia on 17–20 September "to gain first-hand knowledge of the humanitarian and human rights situations and needs on the ground, including the position of those displaced by the conflict and other vulnerable groups" with the permission of Georgia and Russia and the findings would be used to revise $59 million humanitarian aid proposal.

== International NGOs ==
Organisation	Response
Amnesty International	In November 2008, Amnesty International released a 69-page report citing both Georgia and Russia for serious violations of the international war laws.
Caritas Internationalis	On 11 August 2008, Caritas claimed to be providing humanitarian assistance and urged an end to the hostilities. Secretary General Lesley-Anne Knight said, "Russia and Georgia must step back from all-out war. Already, the conflict has caused too much suffering to thousands of innocent civilians. It will take a huge regional effort to rebuild shattered communities. Caritas appeals to both sides to do everything in their power to respect the lives of civilians. Caritas supports the need for humanitarian corridors into South Ossetia as a short-term solution, but peace talks must take place now. Both sides must respect the rights of ethnic minorities to avoid a further escalation in the conflict." Programme Manager Liana Mkheidze from Caritas Georgia said, "Many people are coming to Tbilisi from Georgian villages around Tskhinvali and the also from Gori. Their houses have been damaged, and they're escaping the bombardment. Caritas Georgia distributed 1920 small cans of tuna-fish and 420 cans of canned meat together with 500 loaves of freshly baked bread from its own bakery. We are preparing to distribute more bread and preparing food at our soup-kitchen if necessary to provide food to those made homeless." Director of Caritas Vladikavkaz (North Ossetia–Alania) Sergey Basiev said, "There are lots of refugees seeking shelter. They have nothing. The situation is dreadful. We will try to meet these urgent needs."
Human Rights Watch	Holly Cartner, Europe and Central Asia director at HRW, said on 9 August 2008, "All sides must remember that attacks on civilians, or acts intended to terrorize civilians, clearly violate international humanitarian law, and may constitute war crimes. This would be true even if they are carried out in reprisal for indiscriminate attacks by the adversary." The organization stated that the number of casualties in South Ossetia was not verified.
International Committee of the Red Cross	Spokeswoman Anna Nelson said on 8 August 2008 that they had information that hospitals in Tskhinvali and ambulances had a hard time dealing with the casualties. On 8 August, ICRC said that it wanted to secure a humanitarian corridor to Tskhinvali. On 11 August, the ICRC released a statement saying they were sending 15 tons of medical aid (including water equipment) from Geneva to Georgia. The ICRC confirmed the displacement of civilians in the region around Gori. However, the ICRC team could not enter South Ossetia, and the ICRC called for unrestricted access to the area. The ICRC statement said, "the ICRC has officially reminded Georgia and Russia of their obligation under international humanitarian law to protect civilians and distinguish at all times between the civilian population and those taking a direct part in the hostilities. The four Geneva Conventions, their Additional Protocol I and the customary rules and principles of international humanitarian law are all applicable in this situation." The ICRC had presence in Tbilisi, Zugdidi, Gori, Georgia, and more ICRC representatives would arrive in Georgia in several days. On 13 August, the ICRC announced that humanitarian aid had been delivered from Jordan to 5,000 Georgian families.

== Popular protests regarding Russo-Georgian War ==
Popular protests for peace were held throughout Europe and in the United States as the war unfolded.

== See also ==
- Government and intergovernmental reactions to the Russian invasion of Ukraine
