= Guidotti =

Guidotti is an Italian surname derived from the masculine personal name Guido. Notable people with the surname include:

- Galgano Guidotti (1148–1181), Italian Catholic saint
- Luisa Guidotti Mistrali (1932–1979), Italian Roman Catholic missionary in Zimbabwe
- Paolo Guidotti, also known as il Borghese (1559–1629), Italian painter, sculptor and architect
- Salvatore Guidotti (1836–after 1889), Italian painter
- Stefano Guidotti (born 1999), Swiss footballer

== See also ==
- 27270 Guidotti, a main-belt asteroid named after Guido Guidotti
- Guidotti–Greenspan rule, for which country's reserves should equal short-term external debt
- Guidi
