= Foreign-exchange reserves of India =

India's foreign currency holdings

The foreign reserves of India are holdings of cash, bank deposits, bonds, and other financial assets denominated in currencies other than India's national currency, the Indian rupee. The foreign-exchange reserves are managed by the Reserve Bank of India (RBI) for the Indian government, and the main component is foreign currency assets.

Foreign-exchange reserves act as the first line of defense for India in case of economic slowdown, but acquisition of reserves has its own costs. Foreign exchange reserves facilitate external trade and payment and promote orderly development and maintenance of foreign exchange market in India.

India's total foreign exchange (forex) reserves stand at around US$729.328 billion on 21 August 2026, with the foreign currency assets (FCA) component at around US$591.3 billion, gold reserves at around US$114.2 billion, special drawing rights (SDRs) with the International Monetary Fund (IMF) of around US$18.85 billion and around US$4.9 billion reserve position in the IMF, as per the RBI's weekly statistical supplement published on 28 August 2026. The Economic Survey of India in 2014-15 stated India could target foreign exchange reserves of US$750 billion-US$1 Trillion.

India's foreign exchange reserves are mainly composed of the United States Dollar in the forms of United States government bonds and institutional bonds. with nearly 7.34% of forex reserves in gold. The FCAs also include investments in United States Treasury bonds, bonds of other selected governments and deposits with foreign central and commercial banks. As of September 2021, India holds fourth largest foreign-exchange reserves in the world after China, Japan, and Switzerland.

== Composition ==
The Reserve Bank of India Act and the Foreign Exchange Management Act, 1999 set the legal provisions for governing the foreign exchange reserves. The Reserve Bank of India (RBI) accumulates foreign currency reserves by purchasing from authorized dealers in open market operations. Foreign exchange reserves of India act as a cushion against rupee volatility once global interest rates start rising.

The Foreign Exchange Reserves of India consists of below four categories;

1. Foreign Currency Assets - Total FCA till March 2021 was $536.69 billion out of which $359.87 billion is invested in overseas securities, $153.39 billion is deposited with other central banks and $23.42 (4.36 percent of total FCA) billion is deposited with overseas commercial banks.
2. Gold - As of March 2021, the RBI held 695.31 metric tonnes of gold. 403.01 metric tonnes of which is in custody of Bank of England and Bank for International Settlements. 292.30 tonnes of gold is held domestically.
3. Special Drawing Rights (SDRs)
4. Reserve Tranche Position

== Statistics ==
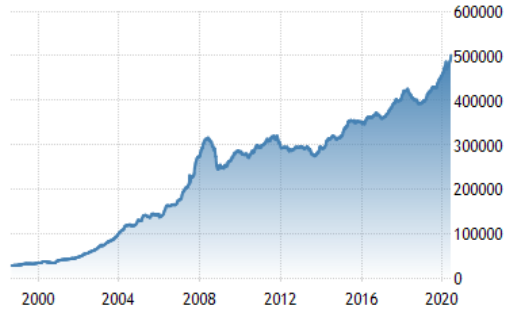
Foreign Exchange Reserves of India

- In 1960, forex reserves covered just 8.6 weeks of imports
- In 1980, India had foreign exchange reserves of over US$7 billion, more than double the level (U$2.55 billion) of what China had at that time.
- In 1990, forex reserves covered just 4.8 weeks of imports
- Foreign exchange reserves of India reached milestone of $100 billion mark only in 2004.
- India was forced to sell dollars to the extent of close to US$35 billion in the spot markets in Financial Year 2009 due to 22% depreciation in rupee (against the dollar) in the same fiscal year 2009.
- In 2009, India purchased 200 tonnes of gold from the International Monetary Fund, worth US$6.7bn (€4.57bn, £4.10bn).
- In June 2020, India's foreign exchange reserves crossed the US$500 billion mark for the first time.
- In June 2021, India's foreign exchange reserves crossed the US$600 billion mark for the first time.
- India's total forex reserves touched an all-time high of US$642.453 billion on 8 September 2021. The reserves declined to $598.89 billion by 8 September 2023 & rose to hit a fresh all time high of $642.63 in March 2024.
- India's total forex reserves touched an all-time high of US$704.89 billion on 27 September 2024.
- In September 2025, India's foreign exchange reserves again reached approximately US$700 billion. According to the Reserve Bank of India's half-yearly review, reserves stood at US$700.09 billion at the end of September 2025, compared with US$668.33 billion at the end of March 2025.
- On 4 September 2026, India's foreign exchange reserves reached an all-time high of US$785.706 billion, following an increase of US$44.903 billion during the week. The increase was attributed to strong foreign currency inflows and measures introduced by the Reserve Bank of India to attract overseas dollar deposits and capital. At this level, India became the world's fourth-largest holder of foreign exchange reserves, overtaking Russia.
- As of 18 September 2026, India's foreign exchange reserves stood at US$765.901 billion and provided cover for approximately 11.2 months of goods imports.
- As of 6 November 2026, India's total foreign exchange reserves stood at US$719.547 billion. The reserves comprised foreign currency assets of US$591.350 billion, gold reserves of US$104.796 billion, Special Drawing Rights (SDRs) of US$18.610 billion and a reserve position in the International Monetary Fund of US$4.791 billion.

== See also ==
India related

- Economic survey of India
- Economy of India
- Remittances to India
- Business process outsourcing to India
- Foreign trade of India
- List of exports of India
- Largest trading partners of India
- Indian diaspora
- Indianisation

Global lists and other nations

- List of countries by GDP (nominal)
- List of countries by foreign-exchange reserves
- Foreign-exchange reserves of China
