= Morocco and the International Monetary Fund =

International Monetary Fund (IMF) has a history of granting conditional loans to Morocco. This article describes the relationship between Morocco and the IMF since it joined in 1958. The IMF has typically worked to promote liberalization of the Moroccan economy and to maintain the stability and liquidity of finances in both the public and private sectors.

== History and current standing ==
Morocco joined the IMF on April 15, 1958. Morocco's Special Drawing Rights (SDR) currently stand at 542.36 million. Their quota holdings are currently worth 894 SDR million. 85.53% of those are part of the IMF's Holdings of Currency or in other words 747.13 SDR millions while the remaining 16.47% is the Reserve Tranche Position or 147.35 SDR millions. As of December 2019, Morocco and the IMF have had 20 arrangements since the country joined the organization (IMF, 2019). Nonetheless, the only specific IMF programs that have ever been put in place in Morocco are the annual Article IV consultations. Moreover, Morocco has no outstanding purchases and loans. Finally, it is in the same constituency as Afghanistan, Algeria, Ghana, Iran, Libya, Pakistan and Tunisia. The executive director of this group is Jafar Mojarrad.

== Current and prospective goals and projects ==
=== Goals ===
The main goals of the IMF's engagement with Morocco are centered around increasing economic growth through improving economic governance by among other things making budget processes more transparent and strengthening fiscal institutions. More specifically, the issues that the IMF is concerned with in regards to the Moroccan economy are excessively high unemployment rates in the population, issues stemming from political conflicts in the region and risks linked to fragility of the euro in light of the strong dependency of the dirham on the euro. All an all, like its other North African counterparts, all of these targets are centered around one rationale shared by most which according to Hanieh is to shape such developing countries "in the image of neoliberalism, rendering North Africa’s uprisings within a discourse amenable to the deepening of pro-market policies".

=== Arrangements ===
The most recent deal between the IMF and Morocco is the Precautionary and Liquidity Line Arrangement. It was approved in December 2018 and concluded in May 13th 2019 for a time period of two years. The arrangement is worth an amount of SDR 2.15 billion. This is worth 240% of the quota currently held by Morocco. The deal works a security line on which Morocco can draw on in times of need. These types of agreements provided by the IMF are more specifically designed "in the event of a severe balance of payment crisis caused by deterioration in the international economic situation". The conditions of the agreement involve several reforms in various sectors including fiscal and monetary policy that authorities are obliged to implement. According to the report published by the IMF, the Moroccan government has been fairly successful at doing so. A similar agreement had previously been approved between the IMF and Morocco in August 2012 for a value of $6.2 billion.

=== Achievements ===
On the one side, economic growth has slightly weakened since 2018. This is mainly due to lower agricultural growth and slow growth in the tertiary sector. The position of Morocco on the international market has also worsened as the current account deficit has grown. On the other, economic health in many other aspects in Morocco has improved fairly well in the past few years. Macroeconomic vulnerabilities have gone down, inflation and public debt is declining while government revenues, FDI and exports in two of the main export sectors of the Moroccan economy, phosphate and automobile, have risen.
