= International reserves of Russia =

The international reserves of Russia are liquid assets held by the Central Bank of Russia or other monetary authorities in order to implement monetary policies relating to the country's currency exchange rate and ensuring the payment of its imports. The assets include foreign currency and foreign denominated bonds, gold reserves, SDRs (special drawing rights) and the IMF reserve position.

== International reserves of Russia ==
- All values are in millions of United States dollars.

End of the year	Value of the International reserves	Growth rate	of which the value of gold is	gold reserves as % of the International reserves
2024	609,068	1.75% ▲	195,707	32.13%
2023	598,592	2.85% ▲	155,858	26.04%
2022	581,989	7.71% ▼	136,077	23.38%
2021	630,627	5.85% ▲	133,070	21.10%
2020	595,774	10.14% ▲	138,754	23.29%
2019	540,917	15.46% ▲	107,903	19.95%
2018	468,495	8.26% ▲	86,903	18.55%
2017	432,742	14.56% ▲	76,647	17.71%
2016	377,741	2.54% ▲	60,194	15.94%
2015	368,399	-4.43% ▼	48,563	13.18%
2014	385,460	-24.36% ▼	46,089	11.96%
2013	509,595	-5.21% ▼	39,990	7.85%
2012	537,618	7.81% ▲	51,039	9.49%
2011	498,649	4.02% ▲	44,697	8.96%
2010	479,379	9.09% ▲	35,788	7.47%
2009	439,450	3.09% ▲	22,798	5.19%
2008	426,281	-10.96% ▼	14,533	3.41%
2007	478,762	57.63% ▲	12,012	2.51%
2006	303,732	66.67% ▲	8,164	2.69%
2005	182,240	46.33% ▲	6,349	3.48%
2004	124,541	61.87% ▲	3,732	3.00%
2003	76,938	60.98% ▲	3,763	4.89%
2002	47,793	30.50% ▲	3,739	7.82%
2001	36,622	30.92% ▲	4,080	11.14%
2000	27,972	124.57% ▲	3,708	13.26%
1999	12,456	1.91% ▲	3,998	32.10%
1998	12,223	-31.27% ▼	4,422	36.18%
1997	17,784	16.05% ▲	4,889	27.49%
1996	15,324	-10.94% ▼	4,047	26.41%
1995	17,207	164.48% ▲	2,824	16.41%
1994	6,506	-26.85% ▼	2,525	38.81%
1993	8,894	Data not available	3,059	34.39%

== Gold reserves of Russia ==
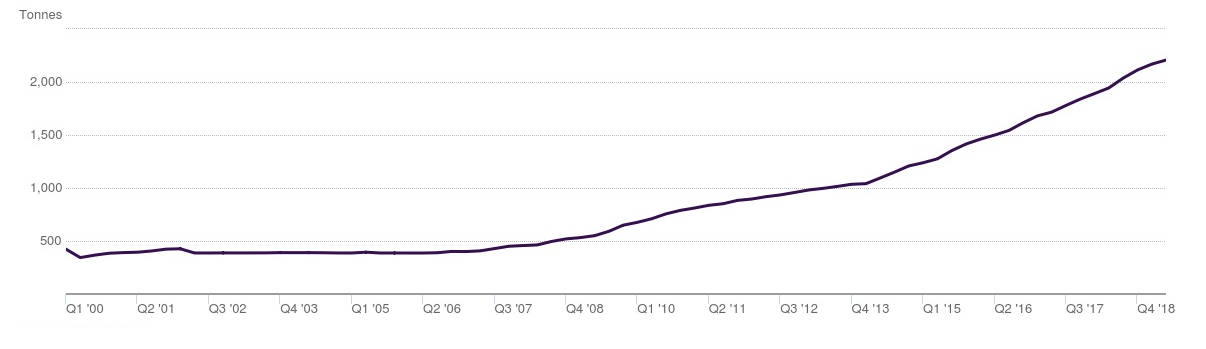
Gold reserves of the Russian Federation 2000 - 2018

End of the year	Tonnes	
2019	2,241	end of October. 5th country
2018	2,077	
2017	1,808	
2016	1,582	
2015	1,382	
2014	1,256	
2013	1,091	
2012	1,011	
2011	944	
2010	807	
2009	664	
2008	595	
2007	548	
2006	532	
2005		
2004		
2003		
2002		
2001		
2000		

== See also ==
- Foreign exchange reserves
- Gold reserve
- Foreign-exchange reserves of China
- Foreign-exchange reserves of India
- Gold reserves of the United Kingdom
- List of countries by foreign-exchange reserves
- List of countries by foreign-exchange reserves (excluding gold)
- List of countries by gold production
