= Financial market reaction to the Russo-Georgian War =

The Russo-Georgian War was linked to the fall of Russian stocks and Russian ruble.

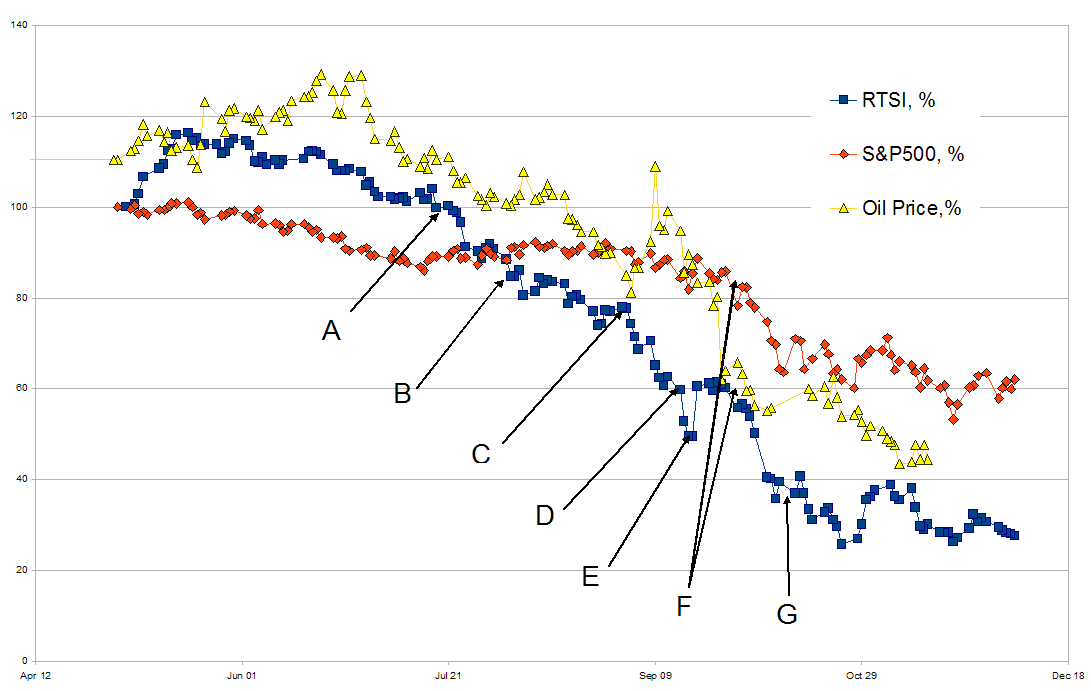
Major Russian stock market RTS Index with S&P 500 and Oil Spot Prices. All data are in percentages to May 1, 2008 values. A - Vladimir Putin criticises Mechel; B - 2008 South Ossetia war starts; C - Recognition of Abkhazia and South Ossetia - by Russia; D - Alexei Kudrin "no systematic crisis" speech; E - measures to save major banks are adopted by the Russian government; F - 2008 financial crisis

== August 2008 ==
Just on 8 August 2008, the day Russia launched a full-scale invasion of Georgia, Russia lost six billion dollars, according to the finance minister of Russia. Russian ruble fell. Lenta.Ru stated that the reports on the entrance of the Russian tanks into South Ossetia was a cue to the investors to sell their assets.

On 8 August 2008, Fitch Ratings lowered Georgia's sovereign debt ratings from BB− to B+, commenting that there were "increased downside risks to Georgia's sovereign creditworthiness". Standard and Poor's also downgraded ratings of Georgia.

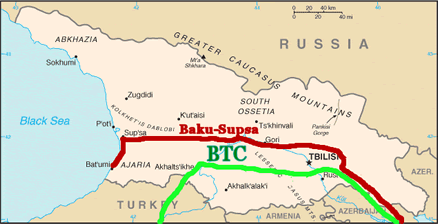
Map of Baku-Supsa and Baku-Tbilisi-Ceyhan pipelines through Georgia

Although Georgia has no notable oil or gas reserves, its territory hosts part of the pipeline supplying Europe, and journalists expressed fear that the war may damage the Baku–Tbilisi–Ceyhan pipeline (BTC pipeline), 30% of which was owned by BP. The BTC pipeline was closed before the conflict because of the terror attack allegedly by the PKK in Turkey on 6 August 2008. On 8 August 2008, light sweet crude for September delivery fell to $115.20 on the New York Mercantile Exchange. The war created further issues for BP.

Georgian government said that Russian warplanes destroyed the port of Poti on 8 August, which the Georgian government called "a key port for the transportation of energy sources" near to the Baku-Supsa pipeline and the Supsa oil terminal. On 9 August 2008, Georgia said that Russian warplanes attacked the Baku-Tbilisi-Ceyhan pipeline.

On 12 August 2008, BP shut down the Baku-Supsa Pipeline and the South Caucasus Pipeline for the safety reasons. Gas supplies through the South Caucasus Pipeline were restarted on 14 August 2008.

When Russian president Dmitry Medvedev announced the cessation of hostilities on 12 August 2008, Russian markets and ruble stopped falling. After Medvedev's recognition of Abkhazia and South Ossetia on 26 August, Russia's indexes and ruble fell.

Russian Finance Minister Alexei Kudrin stated on 17 August that $7 billion left Russia between 8 and 11 August. By 20 August 2008, the market value of the Russian companies fell to less than $1 trillion.

== September 2008 ==
On 9 September 2008, Assistant Secretary of State for European and Eurasian Affairs Daniel Fried said at a hearing of the United States House Committee on Foreign Affairs, "The recent flight of billions of dollars from Russian equity markets is only an initial sign of the costs to Russia over time of its behavior." Fried warned that investors "generally seek a stable relationship with their economic partners and a predictable climate for their investments." Russian journalist Yulia Latynina argued that the investors were reacting to the hearings at the United States Congress where Eric S. Edelman and Daniel Fried stated that Russia was responsible for the August war.

Head of the Moscow branch of Barclays Capital said that the war with Georgia was the tipping point for the investors.

Echo of Moscow reported on 10 September 2008 that experts were assessing the official figure of Russian market loss of $5 billion as artificially lowered. Russian president Medvedev accused the United States of causing the 2008 financial crisis. The Russian stock market was officially recognised as the worst performing stock market in the world on 10 September 2008. The BBC reported that the Russian stocks lost more than $300 billion valuation since the beginning of the war and one Russian expert linked the capital flight to the geopolitical tension between Russia and the West.

On 12 September 2008, Russian president Medvedev attributed only 25% of the stock market fall to the war with Georgia. Medvedev contradicted Vladimir Putin's earlier statement that the Georgian war was not the reason for the fall of the market.

On 17 September 2008, Under Secretary of State for Political Affairs William J. Burns stated before the hearing of the United States Senate Committee on Foreign Relations:

"Since August 7, investor confidence has plummeted; at least in part because of the Georgia crisis, Russian financial markets have lost nearly a third of their value, with losses in market capitalization of hundreds of billions of dollars. Capital is fleeing Russia, with $7 billion leaving the country on August 8 alone, according to Russian Finance Minister Kudrin. The ruble has depreciated by nearly 10 percent since the Georgia crisis began. The Russian Central Bank has spent billions of dollars of its reserves to try to halt the slide of the ruble."

The Wall Street Journal wrote: "The second blow [to the Russian markets] was the war in the Caucasus: Russia crushed the Georgian army, but then Russia itself was crushed by the world economy." Anders Åslund commented on the Russian financial crisis that "Putin has rendered his poor country a prime victim" of his premeditated invasion of Georgia.

With regard to the financial market reaction to the Russo-Georgian War, Agence France-Presse reported on 19 September 2008 that unidentified analysts believed that Russian stock exchange decline in August and September 2008, were attributed to "a mix of falling energy prices, global market turmoil and political issues including worries over the war with Georgia."

In late September, the Kremlin issued $130 billion aid to help recover the stock market. The Financial Times argued that Russian invasion of Georgia damaged "the understanding that if tycoons played by Kremlin rules they would prosper".

On 27 September 2008, US Vice-Presidential candidate Joe Biden said during his meeting with Georgian president Mikheil Saakashvili that Russia was paying price for her actions in Georgia and Russian stock markets lost around $750 billion.

British Foreign Secretary David Miliband suggested that Russia's posture could be changed by the plummeting of Russian stocks, "there is leverage on Russia, in the form of international markets."

Russian billionaire Alexander Lebedev opined by late September 2008 that the war in Georgia was responsible for the 40% drop in the Russian financial market.

== October 2008 ==
Russian economist Andrey Illarionov noted the correlation between the escalation of the aggressive rhetoric of the Russian officials and the sharp drops of the Russian financial markets in August-September 2008.

Former Prime Minister of Estonia Mart Laar stated in October 2008 that it was "miracle" that the Economy of Georgia survived the war. Israeli newspaper Yedioth Ahronoth stated in November 2008 that it was the economy of defeated Georgia that was prospering, not the economy of winning opponent.

Russian newspaper Vedomosti stated in late October 2008 that no investor was fleeing Russia before the war in Georgia. Russian journalist Yulia Latynina commented on the Russian stock collapse that the "Russo-Georgian war can be considered the largest insider deal undertaken so far in the history of mankind".

Bloomberg L.P. agency stated in late October 2008 that the Russian stocks had become the cheapest stocks in the world. Stratfor stated that "nearly $63 billion in foreign investment was pulled out of Russia immediately following the August intervention in Georgia."

== November 2008 ==
Mayor of Moscow Yury Luzhkov claimed in November 2008 that excessive American military spending in Georgia, Ukraine and the Baltic countries was responsible for the 2008 financial crisis. James Rubin noted: "Even before the financial crisis struck last month, Russia's market was collapsing as a result of the Georgian war, making a mockery of Putin's boast that Moscow would soon be the world's financial center." Russian president Medvedev announced in March 2009 that Russia was no longer considering the establishment of the world financial center in Moscow due to the financial crisis.

The financial crisis in Russia caused the separatist sentiments and the emergence of the suggestions to return to the budget relations of the times of the Parade of sovereignties between Moscow and the regions. Head of Tatarstan Mintimer Shaimiev supported the idea of strengthening of federalism in Russia and the revision of the relations between the federal center and the regions. Head of the Republic of Bashkortostan Murtaza Rakhimov said that the restoration of the elements of federalism would be a "worthy response" to the financial crisis. Russian journalist Mikhail Leontyev stated that the World War III was the only way out of the financial crisis and did not rule out that it could begin either with the escalation between Russia and Ukraine or the renewed conflict with Georgia.

== December 2008 ==
The Russian gold and foreign currency reserves had been reduced from $597 billion on 8 August 2008 to $437 billion as of 5 December 2008. Russia's credit rating was downgraded in December 2008 for the first time since the 1998 Russian financial crisis. The Russian authorities banned the word "crisis" for describing the situation in Russia in the state-administered media. Russian expert noted that the Kremlin would increase the verbal attacks on Georgia, Ukraine and the United States to distract the Russian population from the economic problems.

Paddy Ashdown wrote that economic crisis triggered by the war in Georgia would cause Russia to improve relations with the European Union.

The Central Bank of Russia used $74 billion in December 2008 to halt the fall of ruble which had started after the Russian invasion of Georgia in August 2008.

== 2009 ==
The Central Bank of Russia announced in January 2009 that third quarter of 2008 saw a net capital outflow of $17.4 billion, while $130.5 billion left Russia in the fourth quarter. As of 30 January 2009, the Central Bank of Russia had disbursed $211 billion since August 2008.

Petrozavodsk Shipbuilding Plant announced in January 2009 that the Russian financial crisis compelled it to consider selling of warship even to Georgia.

On 3 March 2009, Kommersant newspaper reported that a large part of promised Russian financial aid had not yet arrived in South Ossetia due to dispute between South Ossetian and Russian authorities on the control mechanism of spending. Russian expert Mikhail Aleksandrov explained the wish of Russia to control South Ossetian spending as caused by the financial crisis and that the Russian government lacked funds for Russia's own regions. Kommersant reported on 16 March 2009 that the government-affiliated workers in Tskhinvali received their January-February wages only in March and the authorities explained this delay as caused by the financial crisis in Russia.

In late March 2009, Russian Minister of Regional Development Viktor Basargin stated that by the year's end, the financial crisis could cause the number of budget donor regions to drop to only two: Moscow and Saint Petersburg.

== See also ==
- Great Recession in Russia
