= Wu Sing-yung =

Chinese-American medical professor and historian

- 吴兴镛
- Born: 1939 (age 86–87); China
- Education: National Taiwan University (BA); University of Washington (PhD)
- Spouse: Yvonne Yu (m. 1982)

Wu Sing-yung (Chinese: 吴兴镛; born 1939) is a Chinese-American medical professor and historian.

== Early life ==
He was born in Sichuan. Wu earned a bachelor's degree (1963) from National Taiwan University, a PhD (1969) from University of Washington and a MD (1972) from Johns Hopkins University. He completed his post-graduate medical education at the Universities of Chicago, Washington (Seattle) and California Los Angeles.

== Career ==
He settled at the University of California, Irvine, and was promoted to full professor in Radiological Sciences and Medicine in 1990.

His research and clinical interest were in thyroid hormone metabolism and the management of thyroid diseases. He authored, edited, and contributed to medical books and over a hundred peer-reviewed medical papers. He has had a long-term interest in research on the development of a novel fetal thyroid function marker (W-compound) that may help better manage congenital hypothyroidism. His Thyroid Laboratory at Long Beach VA Medical Center, in collaboration with professors Delbert A. Fisher at Harbor-UCLA Medical Center and Theo Visser at Erasmus Medical Center of Netherlands, has found that sulfo-conjugation is the major pathway for thyroid hormone metabolism in the mammalian fetus.

In addition to medical studies, Wu is interested in modern Chinese history. He was the author and editor of five books in Chinese and two books in English (Father's Gold Secret, 2021; American Gold in Post-Second World War Taiwan-The Forgotten Free China, 2024) about the facts involving the “secret gold shipments” from Shanghai to Taiwan in 1948–49 near the end of the Chinese Civil War. These events were of critical importance on the Republic of China retreat to Taiwan. According to his studies, about 4 million oz. gold and some one hundred million pieces of silver dollars were transferred from Shanghai's state treasury in multiple shipments by air and sea to Taiwan and Xiamen from December 1, 1948, to May 18, 1949. The major portion of the gold (80% or 6.28 million oz.) had originally been sent from the United States during and after World War 2 as part of US aid to China to fight inflation. Nearly all the silver dollars and one million oz of gold in Xiamen were used to support the Nationalist army in contending against the rapid advancement People's Liberation Army (PLA) from April to December 1949 when inflation had flooded the area under the Nationalist control and rendered the paper money worthless.

The rest of the gold, nearly 3 million oz., played a pivotal role in stabilizing the economy of the Nationalist regime (Republic of China, Free China) in Taiwan from 1949 to 1950 until the outbreak of the Korean War on June 25, 1950. Without the gold from the United States and mainland China, Taiwan would certainly have been destabilized by a precipitate currency devaluation, which would have invited a PLA invasion across the Taiwan Strait, leading to its unification with the People's Republic of China in 1950–1951.

Wu married Dr. Yvonne Yan-chiu Yu in 1982.

== Selected works ==
- Wu, Sing-yung, ed. (1991). "Thyroid Hormone Metabolism: Regulation and Clinical Implications". Thyroid hormone metabolism : regulation and clinical implications. First International Conference on the Regulation of Thyroid Hormone Metabolism: Long Beach on September 4–5, 1989. Boston: Blackwell Scientific. ISBN 0-86542-129-3. OCLC 21521989.
- Wu, Sing-yung; Visser, Theo J., eds. (1994). "Thyroid Hormone MetabolismMolecular Biology and Alternate Pathways". Thyroid hormone metabolism : molecular biology and alternate pathways. Second International Conference on Thyroid Hormone metabolism, held in Long Beach, Calif., June 7–8, 1993. Boca Raton: CRC Press. ISBN 0-8493-4774-2. OCLC 645046311.
- Wu, Sing-yung (2007). 黃金檔案 : 國府黃金運台, 1949年 [The Gold File, Transfer of Nationalist China's Gold Reserve from Shanghai to Taiwan in 1949] (in Chinese). Taibei Shi: Shi ying chu ban she. ISBN 978-986-7762-95-5. OCLC 190964480.
- Wu, Sing-yung (2009). 黄金秘档 : 1949年大陆黄金运台始末 [The Chinese Secret Archives of Gold, the Saga of Gold Transfer from Mainland to Taiwan in 1949] (in Chinese). Nanjing: Jiangsu ren min chu ban she. ISBN 978-7-214-06078-5. OCLC 529433554.
- Wu, Sing-yung (2013). 黃金往事 : 一九四九民國人與内戰黃金終結篇 [The Gold Story, the Republic Generation in 1949 and the Final Chapter on the Gold Reserve during Civil War] (in Chinese). Taibei Shi: Shi bao wen hua chu ban qi ye gu fen you xian gong. ISBN 978-957-13-5846-8. OCLC 869393452.
- Wu, Sing-yung, ed. (2016). 吳嵩慶日記 [Wu Songqing's Diary] (in Chinese). Taibei Shi: Zhong yang yan jiu yuan Taiwan shi yan jiu suo. ISBN 978-986-04-8832-6. OCLC 965796060.
- Wu, Songqing (2019). Wu, Sing-yung (ed.). 吴嵩庆战时军费日记 : 1948-1950 [Wartime diary of General Samuel Sung-Ching Wu on the gold military expenditure in Nationalist Army] (in Chinese). Beijing: Zhongguo she hui ke xue chu ban she. ISBN 978-7-5203-4412-8. OCLC 1110684304.
- Wu, Sing-yung (2021). 父亲的黄金秘密 - 1949 [Father's Gold Secret]. Outskirts Press. ISBN 978-1-9772-4386-7.
- Wu, Sing-yung (2024). American Gold in Post-Second World War Taiwan - The Forgotten Free China. Cambridge Scholars. ISBN 978-1-0364-0464-2.
