= Retreat of the government of the Republic of China to Taiwan =

1949 event in the Chinese Civil War

- Five retreats of the ROC Government in 1949: Nanking (Nanjing) → Canton (Guangzhou) → Chungking (Chongqing) → Chengtu (Chengdu) → Taipei and Sichang (Xichang)
- Native name: 中華民國政府遷臺
- English name: Republic of China Government's retreat to Taiwan
- Date: December 7, 1949; 76 years ago
- Location: Taipei, Taiwan Province, Republic of China
- Participants: Government of the Republic of China and the Republic of China Armed Forces

Retreat of the government of the Republic of China to Taiwan
- Traditional Chinese: 中華民國政府遷臺
- Simplified Chinese: 中华民国政府迁台
Transcriptions
Standard Mandarin
- Hanyu Pinyin: Zhōnghuá Mínguó Zhèngfǔ qiāntái
- Bopomofo: ㄓㄨㄥ ㄏㄨㄚˊ ㄇㄧㄣˊ ㄍㄨㄛˊ ㄓㄥˋ ㄈㄨˇ ㄑㄧㄢ ㄊㄞˊ
- Wade–Giles: Chung^{1} Hua^{2} Min^{2} Kuo^{2} Cheng^{4} Fu^{3} Ch'ien^{1} T'ai^{2}
- IPA: [ʈʂʊ́ŋ.xwǎ mǐn.kwǒ ʈʂə̂ŋ.fù tɕʰjɛ́n.tʰǎɪ]
Yue: Cantonese
- Yale Romanization: Jūng Wàh Màhn Gwok Jing Fú Chīn Tòih
- Jyutping: Zung1 Waa4 Man4 Gwok3 Zing3 Fu2 Cin1 Toi4
- IPA: [tsʊŋ˥ wa˩ mɐn˩ kʷɔk̚˧ tsɪŋ˧ fu˧˥ tsʰin˥ tʰɔj˩]
Southern Min
- Hokkien POJ: Tiong-hôa Bîn-kok Chèng-hú Chhian-tâi
- Tâi-lô: Tiong-huâ Bîn-kok Tsìng-hú Tshian-tâi

Alternative Chinese name
- Traditional Chinese: 大撤退
Transcriptions
Standard Mandarin
- Hanyu Pinyin: Dà Chètuì
- Bopomofo: ㄉㄚˋ ㄔㄜˋ ㄊㄨㄟˋ
- Wade–Giles: Ta^{4} Ch'e^{4} T'ui^{4}
- IPA: [tâ ʈʂʰɤ̂ tʰwêɪ]
Yue: Cantonese
- Yale Romanization: Daaih Chit Teui
- Jyutping: Daai6 Cit3 Teoi3
- IPA: [taj˨ tsʰit̚˧ tʰɵɥ˧]
Southern Min
- Hokkien POJ: Tāi-thiat-thè
- Tâi-lô: Tāi-thiat-thè

The remnants of the government of the Republic of China (ROC), alongside many refugees, retreated to the island of Taiwan (Formosa) on December 7, 1949. The members of the Kuomintang (KMT), its officers, and approximately 2 million ROC troops took part in the retreat, in addition to many civilians and refugees, fleeing the advance of the People's Liberation Army (PLA) of the Chinese Communist Party (CCP). The CCP, who now effectively controlled most of mainland China, spent the subsequent years purging remnant Nationalist forces in western and southern China, solidifying the rule of the newly established People's Republic of China (PRC).

ROC troops mostly fled to Taiwan from provinces in southern China, in particular Sichuan Province, where the last stand of the ROC's main army took place. The flight to Taiwan took place over four weeks after Mao Zedong had declared the founding of the PRC in Beijing on October 1, 1949. In addition, some of the ROC troops in Yunnan also fled to Burma, where the insurgency lasted until 1961.

ROC Army troops remained in control of Kinmen and other islands on the mainland side of the Taiwan Strait, and prevented the PRC from advancing towards the island of Taiwan through the Battle of Kinmen. The ROC continues to remain in control of Kinmen and other nearby islands on the mainland side's Fuchien Province (no territory has changed hands between the ROC and PRC since 1955).

After the retreat, the leadership of the ROC, particularly Generalissimo and President Chiang Kai-shek, planned to make the retreat only temporary, hoping to regroup, fortify, and reconquer the mainland. This plan, which never came to fruition, was known as "Project National Glory" and constituted the national priority of the ROC on Taiwan. The ROC did not abandon the policy of using force for reunification until direct exchanges between the two sides of the Taiwan Strait began in the 1990s.

== Background ==
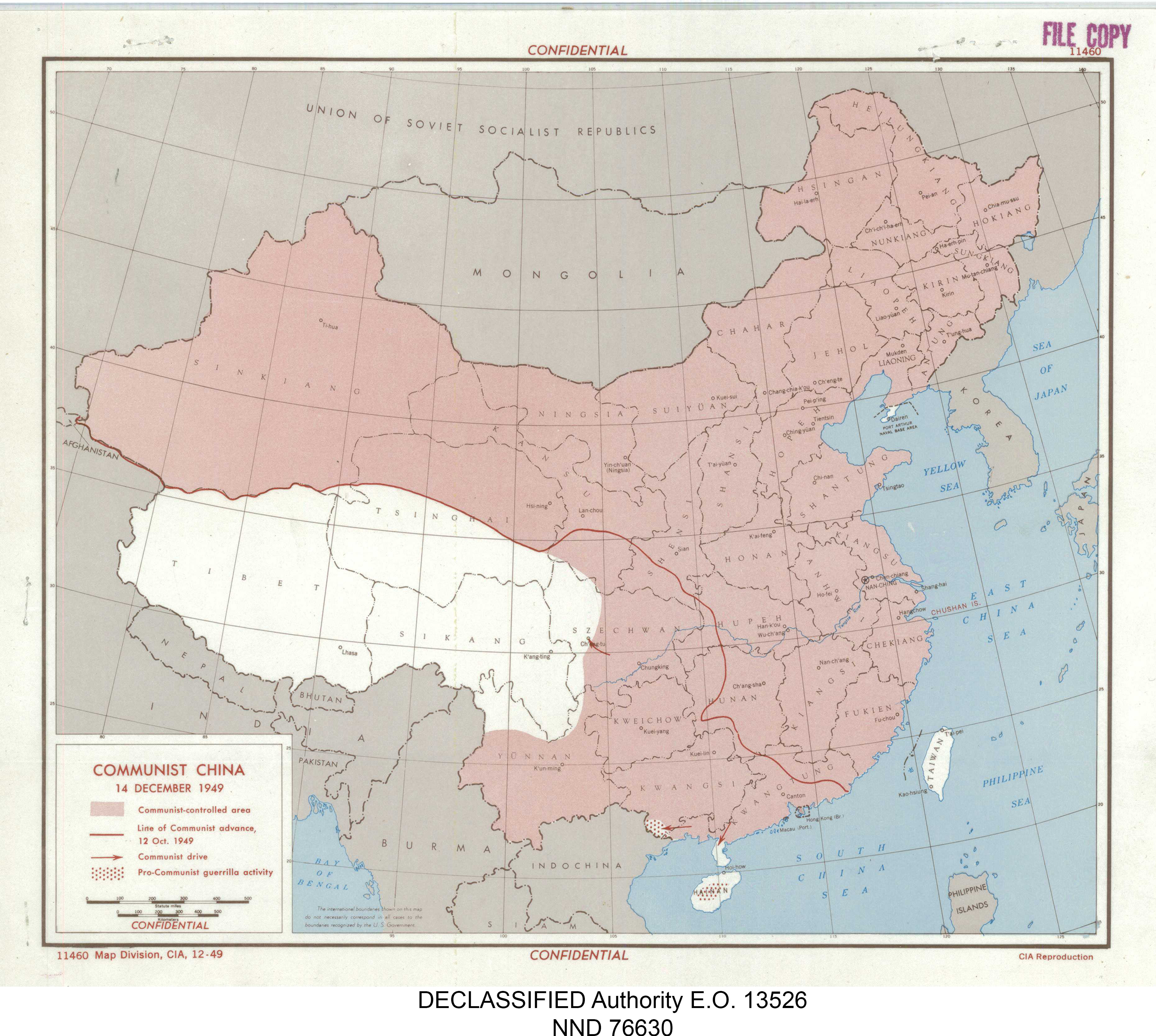
In December 1949, Chinese Communist forces controlled the entirety of mainland China except Hainan and de facto independent Tibet

In 1895, the Qing dynasty was defeated by the Empire of Japan in the First Sino-Japanese War, forcing the Qing dynasty to cede Taiwan and Penghu to the Japanese Empire, which began its 50-year long colonial rule. As World War II ended, the Republic of China, who ousted the Qing dynasty in 1911, regained control of Taiwan in 1945 after the surrender of Japan and placed it under military occupation.

The civil war between the Nationalist Party of China (Kuomintang, or KMT for short) under Chiang Kai-shek and the Chinese Communist Party (CCP) under Mao Zedong traced back to KMT's Shanghai Massacre in 1927, which triggered Communist insurgencies such as the Nanchang Uprising and the Autumn Harvest Uprising, as well as the formation of the Chinese Red Army. The first major conflict occurred in the middle of the Northern Expedition when both parties were supposed to work together to topple the Beiyang government and subdue various warlords in northern China (1926–28), effectively ending the First United Front. The KMT then conducted a series of encirclement campaigns against the Communist-controlled regions, eventually succeeding in the fifth one and forced the surviving Red Army on a strenuous retreat north towards the barren Shaanbei region. Chiang's insistence on purging the Communists continued despite increasing Japanese threat after the Jinan incident in 1928 (which first showcased the sheer arrogant brutality of the Japanese), the Mukden Incident in 1931 (which started the Japanese invasion of Manchuria) and the Shanghai Incident in 1932 (in which the Japanese openly displayed the ambition to conquer East Asia), leading to the Xi'an Incident in 1936 when disgruntled officers led by Zhang Xueliang kidnapped Chiang and forced him to agree to a Second United Front with the Communists against the Japanese. This animosity however continued through the Second Sino-Japanese War (1932–45), during which vast portions of China fell under the occupation of the invading Japanese Empire. This peaked in the New Fourth Army Incident in early 1941, in which an 80,000-strong KMT force ambushed a 9,000-man Communist division and killed most of the latter's officers and soldiers, citing that "the Communists attacked first", effectively ending any trust and further cooperation between the KMT and the CCP.

The civil war between KMT and CCP forces, which took a de jure hiatus during the Japanese invasion, entered its final stage in 1945 following the Japanese surrender. Both sides sought to defeat the other and control all of China, and this need to eliminate the other party was seen as necessary by both Mao Zedong and Chiang Kai-shek, but for completely different reasons. For Mao, the elimination of the "old society" dominated by clans of wealthy oligarchs would forever end the feudal system in China, encouraging and preparing the country for socialism and communism, which he deemed to be the future for humanity; for Chiang, other warlords and political opponents were simply a great threat to his personal dominance within the central government, as evident in Chiang's long-held political philosophy of "[one] must quell the domestic before resisting the foreign" (攘外必先安內). While Chiang relied heavily on foreign assistance from the United States under President Harry Truman and the China Lobby, Mao had support from the Soviet Union under Joseph Stalin, as well as popular support from the impoverished rural population of China. The ideological unity of the CCP, and the experience acquired in guerilla warfare fighting the Japanese, prepared them for the people's war against the Kuomintang. Though Chiang's forces were well equipped by the U.S., they lacked effective leadership, political unity and sufficient ideological willpower among their ranks.

The conflicts between the KMT and CCP resumed in 1946. As the tide of war turned with the Communist victory in Manchuria, Chiang concluded in late 1948 that he needed to move to Taiwan; by the end of 1948 he had started shipments of China's important cultural artefacts and financial reserves to Taiwan. By 1948–1949, most of the northern mainland fell to the communists after the three decisive campaigns of Liaoshen, Pingjin and Huaihai. In January 1949, Chiang Kai-shek stepped down as leader of the KMT and was replaced by his vice-president, Li Zongren. Li and Mao entered into negotiations for peace, but Nationalist hardliners rejected Mao's demands. When Li sought an additional delay in mid-April 1949, the Chinese Red Army — now called the People's Liberation Army — crossed the Yangtze River and captured the Nationalist capital Nanjing and the major city of Shanghai, later Guangzhou, followed by Chongqing and then Chengdu. Mao proclaimed the establishment of a new republic in Beijing on October 1, while Chiang fled to the island of Formosa (Taiwan), where approximately 300,000 soldiers had already been airlifted.

== Relocation of forces and people ==
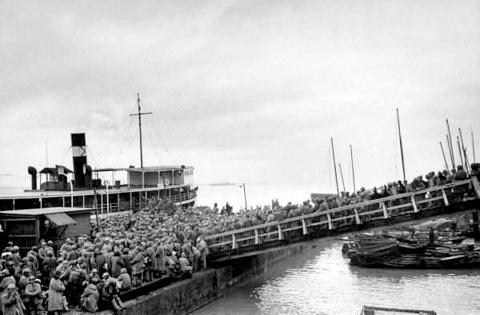
ROCA soldiers boarding a ship during the retreat

Future Chinese Cultural University founder Chang Chi-yun was the first to propose moving to Taiwan in 1948. Throughout four months beginning in August 1948, the ROC leaders relocated the Republic of China Air Force to Taiwan, taking over 80 flights and three ships. Chen Chin-chang writes in his book Chiang Kai-shek's Retreat to Taiwan (蔣中正遷台記) that an average of 50 or 60 planes flew daily between Taiwan and China transporting fuel and ammunition between August 1949 and December 1949.

Chiang also sent the 26 naval vessels of the Nationalist army to Taiwan. The final Communist assault against Nationalist forces began on April 20, 1949, and continued until the end of summer. By August, the People's Liberation Army dominated almost all of mainland China; the Nationalists held only Taiwan and the Pescadores Islands, some parts of Guangdong, Fukien, Zhejiang and a few regions in China's far west.

Institute of History and Philology director Fu Ssu-nien spearheaded a rush to persuade scholars to flee to Taiwan, as well as bringing books and documents. Institutions and colleges like Academia Sinica, National Palace Museum, National Tsing Hua University, National Chiao Tung University, Soochow University, Fu Jen Catholic University and St. Ignatius High School were re-established in Taiwan.

In total, according to current estimates, a migration of between 900,000 and 1,100,000 people must have taken place to Taiwan from mainland China between 1945 and 1955. The prior population of the island, at the end of Japanese rule, is estimated as 6,500,000 (see also Population of Taiwan). Of these, the Japanese subpopulation of about 500,000 were mostly repatriated by 1946. The number of immigrants is not known for certain, however, since no precise census was made before or during Japanese rule. The census of 1956 counts 640,000 civilian migrants from the mainland. The size of the army was secret at the time. Taiwanese documents found much later count 580,000 soldiers. American contemporary intelligence, however, put the number at only 450,000. Additionally, some army personnel were discharged before 1956 and are therefore (or for other reasons) included in both numbers, while others were drafted locally and were not immigrants. Such considerations led scholars to the above estimate. It is noted that upper estimates of up to two or three million immigrants are commonly found in older publications. Immigration on a similar scale took place in Hong Kong at the time.

== Liquid assets and artifacts ==
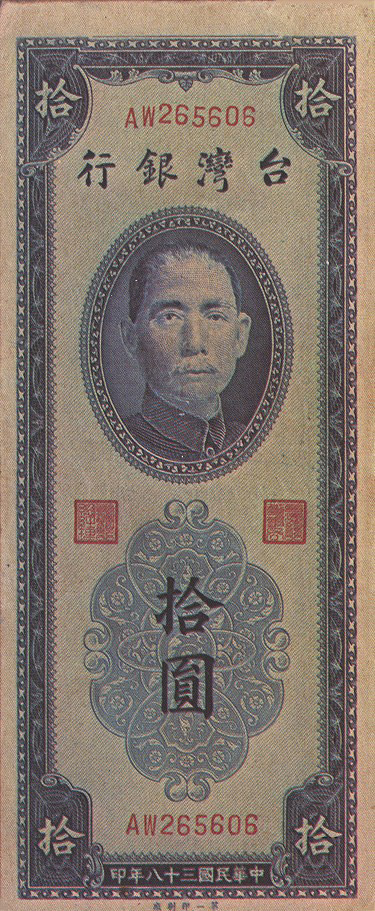
The New Taiwan dollar first issued in 1949

As the defeated Nationalists fled to Taiwan, they stripped China of liquid assets including gold, silver, and the country's dollar reserves.

Chiang Kai-shek's mission to take gold from China was held secretly because, according to Wu Sing-yung, the entire mission was operated by Chiang himself. Only Chiang and Wu's father, who was the head of Military Finance for the KMT government, knew about the expenditure and moving of gold to Taiwan and almost all orders by Chiang were issued verbally. Wu stated that even the finance minister had no power over the final expenditure and transfer. The written record was kept as the top military secret by Chiang in the Taipei Presidential Palace and the declassified archives only became available to the public more than 40 years after his death in April 1975. It is a widely held belief that the gold brought to Taiwan was used to lay the foundations for the Taiwanese economy and government. Some also believe that after six months of the gold operation by Chiang, the New Taiwanese dollar was launched, which replaced the old Taiwanese dollar at a ratio of one to 40,000. It is believed that 800,000 taels of gold were used to stabilize the economy which had been suffering from hyperinflation since 1945. However, these beliefs turned out to be mistaken. According to a memoir written by Zhou Hong-tao, a long-term aide-de-camp of Chiang, the gold was consumed very fast after being brought to Taiwan and in less than two years 80% was already consumed for the funds and provisions for the troops.

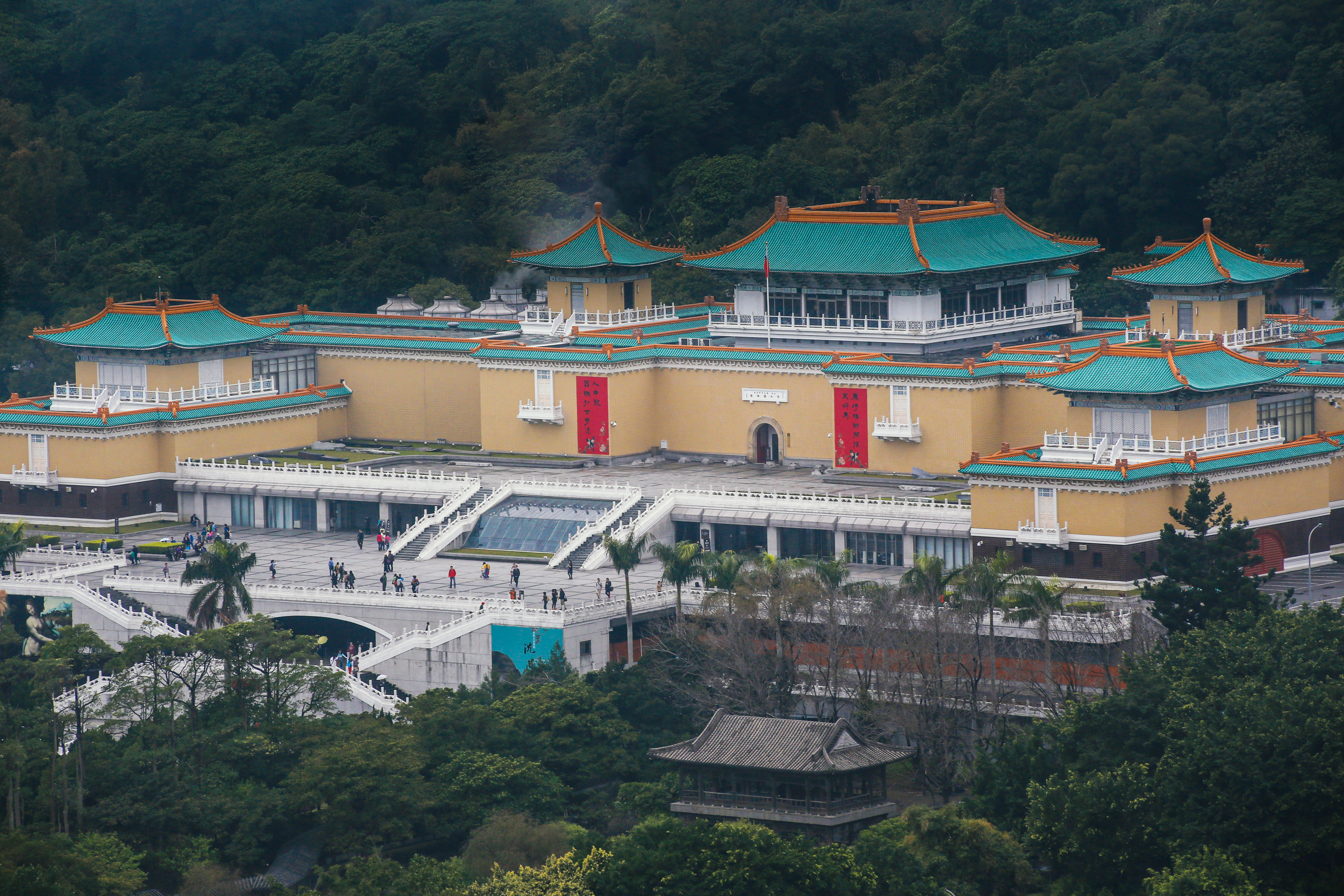
The National Palace Museum in Taipei, Taiwan

The KMT also retreated with artifacts kept mostly in the National Palace Museum in Taipei, Taiwan. The National Palace Museum claims that in 1948 when China was going through its Civil War, executive director Chu Chia-hua and others (Wang Shijie, Fu Ssu-nien, Xu Hong-Bao (Chinese: 徐洪宝), Li Ji, and Han Lih-wu) discussed shipping masterpieces to Taiwan for the artifacts' safety. Other institutions, such as the Henan Museum, also evacuated their collections of cultural relics to Taiwan during the war.

The plan was not fully implemented and completed due to insufficient cabin space and differing opinions on the relocation of artifacts to Taiwan.

== Immediate ROC military actions ==
KMT forces attempted to destroy industrial sites, but workers were able to stop them at many such locations.

From Taiwan, Chiang's air force attempted to bomb the mainland cities of Shanghai and Nanking, but to no effect. Chiang's ground forces aimed to return to the mainland, but had no long-term success. Communist forces were left in control of all of China except Hainan Island and Taiwan.

As a whole, the Civil War had an immense impact on the Chinese people. The historian Jonathan Fenby proposes that "hyperinflation [during the Chinese Civil War] undermined everyday lives and ruined tens of millions, hampered by a poor taxation base, increased military spending and widespread corruption."

== Plans to retake mainland China ==
Originally, the Republic of China planned to reconquer the mainland from the People's Republic of China. After the retreat to Taiwan, Chiang Kai-shek established a dictatorship over the island with other Nationalist leaders and began making plans to invade the mainland. Chiang conceived a top secret plan called Project National Glory or Project Guoguang (Chinese: 國光計劃; pinyin: Gúoguāng Jìhuà; lit. 'National glory plan/project'), to accomplish this. Chiang's planned offensive involved 26 operations including land invasions and special operations behind enemy lines. He had asked his son Chiang Ching-kuo to draft a plan for air raids on the provinces of Fujian and Guangdong, from where many ROC soldiers and much of the population of Taiwan had origins. If it had taken place, it would have been the largest seaborne invasion in history.

=== Context of Project National Glory ===
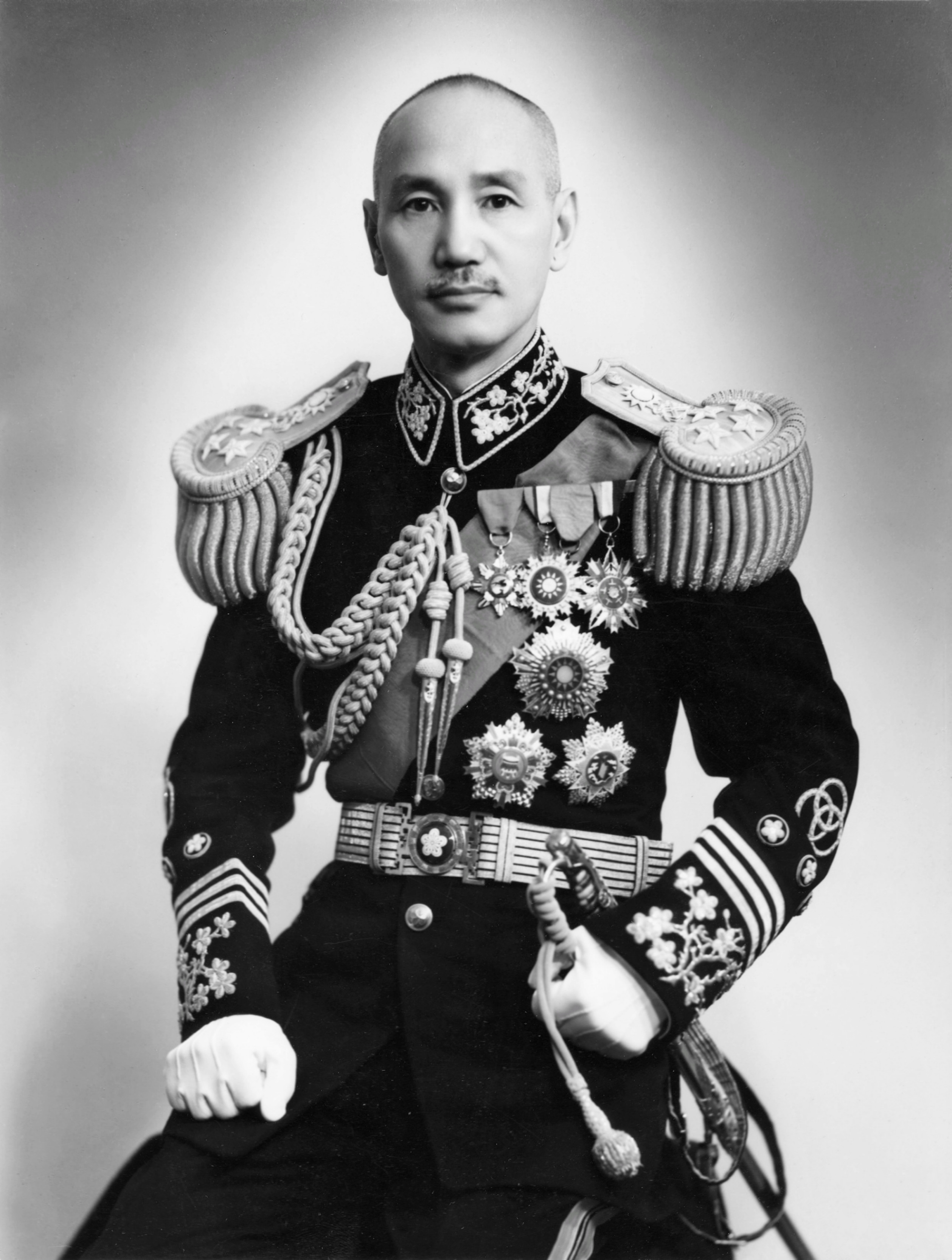
Chiang Kai-shek, The Man who Lost China (1952)

The 1960s saw the "Great Leap Forward" in mainland China lead to catastrophic famines and millions of deaths, as well as progress by the PRC towards possible development of nuclear weapons. Thus, Chiang Kai-shek saw a crisis-opportunity to launch an attack to reclaim mainland China.

At this time, the U.S. was fighting the Vietnam War. For Project National Glory to be successful Chiang Kai-shek knew he needed U.S. military assistance. Thus he offered to help the Americans fight the Vietnam War in exchange for U.S. support conducive to taking back his lost territory. The U.S. opposed and refused Chiang's suggestions. This did not stop him. Rather, Chiang went ahead with the preparations and continued to further his plan to take back their lost territory.

In 1965, Chiang's plans to strike were completed. His generals and admirals planned possible dates to deploy while soldiers and field officers prepared for battle, according to the government archives.

=== Chronology ===
April 1, 1961: The year witnessed the advent of the Project National Glory. The office was built by the Republic of China Armed Forces together with the Ministry of National Defense in the town of Sanxia, Taipei County (now a district in New Taipei City). Army Lieutenant General Zhu Yuancong took the role of governor and officially launched the project to compose a prudent plan of operations to recover the lost territories in mainland China. At the same time, the establishment of Project Juguan came to light whereby military members began to work out a possible alliance with American troops to attack mainland China.

April 1964: During this year, Chiang Kai-shek arranged an ensemble of air-raid shelters and five military offices at Lake Cihu (Chinese: 慈湖), which served as a secret command center. Following the establishment of Project National Glory, several sub-plans were put into place, such as the frontal area of the enemy, rear area special warfare, surprise attack, taking advantage of the counterattack, and assistance against tyranny.

However, the United States Armed Forces and the U.S. Department of Defense, together with the State Department, strongly opposed Project National Glory; rejecting the KMT plan to retake mainland China. Thus, every week American troops checked the inventory of Republic of China Marine Corps amphibious landing vehicles used by ROC and ordered American military advisory group members to fly over the Project National Glory camp to scouting missions. These flyovers infuriated Chiang Kai-shek.

June 17, 1965: Chiang Kai-shek visited the Republic of China Military Academy to convene with all mid-level and higher officers to devise and launch the counterattack.

June 24, 1965: At least ten soldiers died during a training drill to feign a Communist attack on major naval bases in southern Taiwan near Zuoying District when rough seas overturned five landing craft. The deaths that occurred during the happening were the first but not the last in Project National Glory.

August 6, 1965: A People's Liberation Army Navy torpedo boat ambushed and drowned 200 soldiers as the Zhangjiang naval warship carried out assignment Tsunami Number 1, in an attempt to transport special forces to the vicinity of the Eastern mainland Chinese coastal island of Dongshan to carry out an intelligence gathering operation.

November 1965: Chiang Kai-shek ordered two other naval vessels, the CNS Shan Hai and the CNS Lin Huai to pick up injured soldiers from Taiwan's offshore islands of Magong and Wuqiu. The vessels were attacked by 12 PRC ships, the Lin Huai sunk, and roughly 90 soldiers and sailors were killed in action. Surprised by the heavy loss of life in the naval battle at Magong, Chiang gave up all hope for Project National Glory.

Having said this, according to General Huang Chih-Chung, who was an army colonel at the time and part of the planning process, Chiang Kai-shek never completely gave up the desire to recapture China; "even when he died (in 1975), he was still hoping the international situation would change and that the Communists would be wiped out one day."

=== Failure and shift of focus to modernization ===
The failure of Chiang's Project National Glory changed the course of Chinese and Taiwanese history, forever altering cross-strait relations. For example, the Taiwanese "shifted the focus to modernizing and defending Taiwan instead of preparing Taiwan to take back China," stated Andrew Yang, a political scientist specializing in Taiwan-Mainland China relations at the Taipei-based Council of Advanced Policy Studies. Chiang Kai-shek's son Chiang Ching-Kuo, who later succeeded him as president, focused on maintaining peace between the mainland and Taiwan. Today, political relations between Taiwan and China have changed; as General Huang said, "I hope it will develop peacefully... There's no need for war."

== Reform of the Kuomintang ==
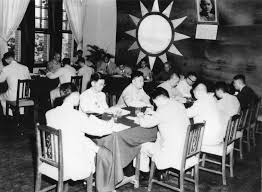
In August 1950, the KMT held its first Central reform Committee meeting to launch the party's reforms. (1950)

After being expelled from the mainland, Chiang Kai-shek and other KMT leaders realized they had to reform the party.

Party flag and emblem of the Kuomintang; based on the Blue Sky with a White Sun, which also appears in the Flag of the Republic of China.

Initially, the party had seen public schools as a necessary instrument of assimilation and nation-building. Private schools, seen as unwanted competition, were therefore suppressed. However, as education needs on the island began to outstrip government resources, the party reevaluated its approach. Starting in 1954, private schools were not only tolerated but backed by state funding. Simultaneously, steps were taken to secure the obedience of private schools, such as ensuring the placement of party loyalists on school boards and the passing of strict laws to control the political content of the curricula.

== Legality ==
While the generally established view is that the KMT legally gained territorial sovereignty over Taiwan in 1945 (following the surrender of Japan), some have opposed this view.

According to a 1955 article, "It has been charged that Chiang Kai-shek has no claim to the island because he is 'merely a fugitive quartering his army' there and besides, his is a government in exile." Moreover, the Treaty of San Francisco, which was officially signed by 48 nations on September 8, 1951, did not specify to whom Japan was ceding Taiwan and Penghu. Despite this, the ROC was viewed by the vast majority of states at the time as the legitimate representative of China, as it had succeeded the Qing Dynasty, while the PRC was at the time a mostly unrecognized state. Japan was, at the time of the signing of the Treaty of San Francisco, still technically under American occupation. After full independence, Japan established full relations with the ROC and not the PRC.

According to Professor Gene Hsiao, "Since the San Francisco Peace Treaty and the separate KMT treaty with Japan did not specify to whom Japan was ceding Taiwan and the Pescadores, the U.S. position implied that legally, and insofar as the signatories of those two treaties were concerned, Taiwan became an 'ownerless' island and the KMT, by its own assent to the American policy, a foreign government-in-exile."

== Aftermath ==
On October 25, 1971, the United Nations General Assembly passed Resolution 2758, recognizing the PRC as the sole legitimate representative of China to the UN. Once it became apparent that such a plan could not be realized, the ROC's national focus shifted to the modernization and economic development of Taiwan. After the plan to counterattack the mainland was terminated, the Kuomintang began the process of localization under the leadership of Chiang Ching-kuo. The ROC, continues to officially claim exclusive sovereignty over the now-CCP-governed mainland China till now (Both the ROC and PRC also claim the Senkaku (Diaoyutai) Islands administered by Japan). However, after Taiwan's democratization in the 1990s, President Lee Teng-hui claimed that the sovereignty of the Republic of China only extended to Taiwan. Since 2004, the Republic of China has officially stopped using maps and administrative region codes related to mainland China, the current release of "Taiwan Complete Map" only includes Taiwan Area.

== See also ==
- Outline of the Chinese Civil War
- Timeline of the Chinese Civil War
- Xi'an Incident
- Operation King Kong
- Conservatism in Taiwan
- Two Chinas
- China and the United Nations
- United Nations General Assembly Resolution 2758
