= List of countries by foreign exchange reserves =

Foreign exchange reserves of various countries

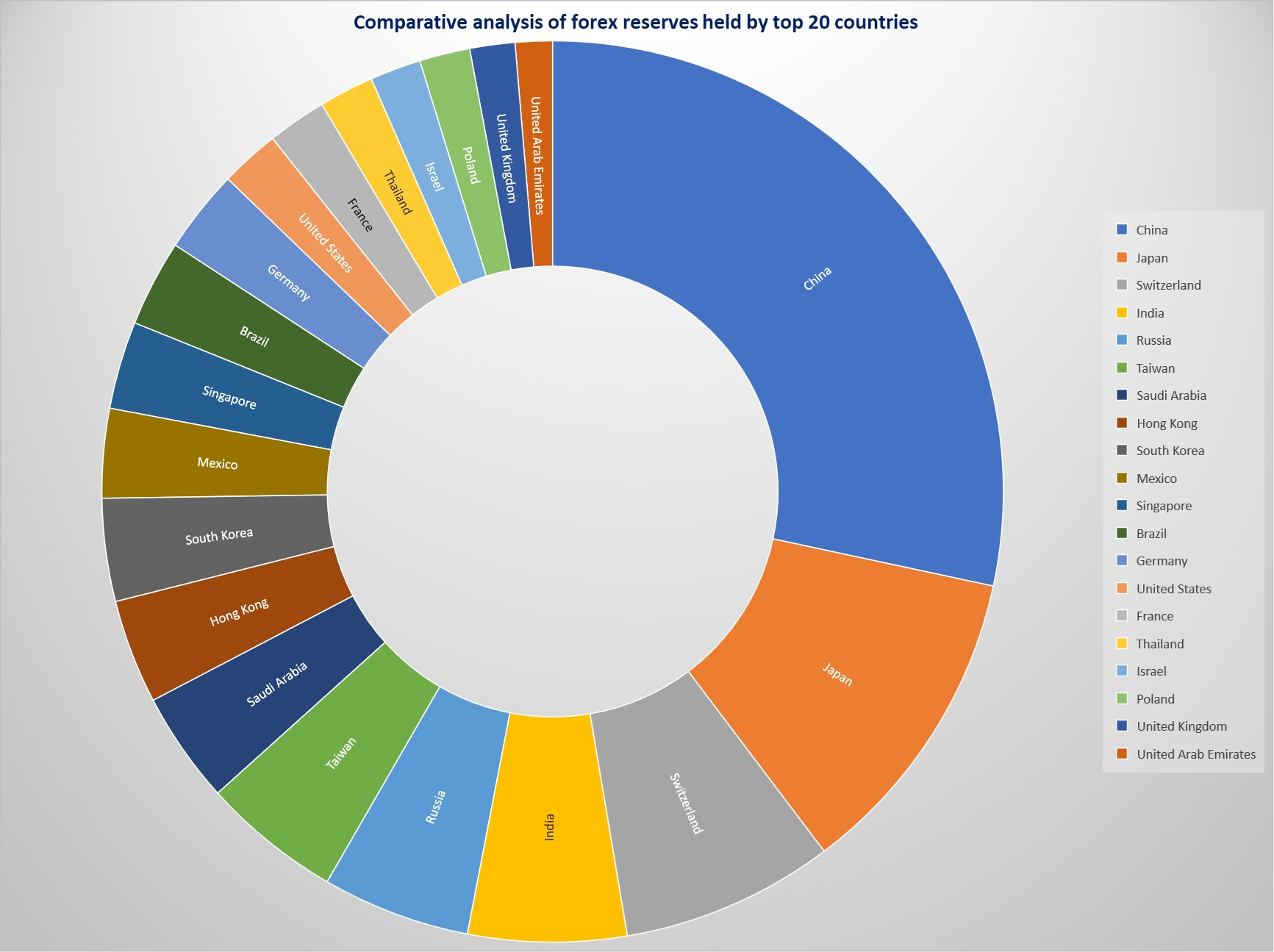
Comparison of forex reserves of top 20 countries

Foreign exchange reserves, also called Forex reserves, in a strict sense, are foreign-currency deposits held by nationals and monetary authorities. However, in popular usage and in the list below, it also includes gold reserves, special drawing rights (SDRs), and IMF reserve positions because this total figure (more accurately called "official reserves", "international reserves", or "official international reserves"), is more readily available and also arguably more meaningful. These foreign-currency deposits are the financial assets of the central banks and monetary authorities that are held in different reserve currencies (e.g., the U.S. dollar, the euro, the pound sterling, the Japanese yen, the Indian rupee, the Swiss franc, and the Chinese renminbi) and which are used to back its liabilities (e.g., the local currency issued and the various bank reserves deposited with the central bank by the government or financial institutions). Before the end of the gold standard, gold was the preferred reserve currency.

Foreign-exchange reserves are generally used to intervene in the foreign exchange market to stabilize or influence the value of a country's currency. Central banks can buy or sell foreign currency to influence exchange rates directly. For example, if a currency is depreciating, a central bank can sell its reserves in foreign currency to buy its own currency, creating demand and helping to stabilize its value. High levels of reserves instill confidence among investors and traders. If market participants believe that a country has sufficient reserves to support its currency, they are less likely to engage in speculative attacks that could lead to a sharp depreciation. In times of economic uncertainty or financial market volatility, central banks can use reserves to smooth out fluctuations in the exchange rate, reducing the impact of sudden capital outflows or shocks to the economy. Adequate reserves ensure that a country can meet its international payment obligations, which helps maintain a stable exchange rate by preventing panic in the foreign exchange market. Having substantial reserves allows central banks to implement monetary policies more effectively. They can afford to maintain interest rates or engage in other measures without the immediate fear of depleting reserves, which can influence market expectations positively.

== Forex reserves by country ==
All the figures below have been converted to U.S. dollars, as different countries report data in different currencies. The U.S. dollar equivalents have been calculated using currency exchange rates as well as the gold price at the reported date. Not all countries keep gold as reserves, to avoid physical storage costs and the risks associated with it. In these cases no values are shown in the excluding gold columns.

Country (as recognized by the UN)	Continent	Foreign exchange reserves				Last reported date	Ref.
Country (as recognized by the UN)	Continent	Including gold		Excluding gold		Last reported date	Ref.
Country (as recognized by the UN)	Continent	US$ million	Change	US$ million	Change	Last reported date	Ref.
China	Asia	3,854,885	▲4,299	3,504,805	▲115,499	1 August 2026	
Japan	Asia	1,287,470	▼18,400	1,259,248	▲16,230	30 June 2026	
Switzerland	Europe	939,140	▲13,935	932,282	▲24,490	30 June 2026	
Russia	Europe/Asia	761,200	▲5,600	434,487	▲1,517	21 August 2026	
India	Asia	734,606	▲12,952	628,900	▲56,790	9 October 2026	
Taiwan	Asia	597,150	▼7,920	544,300	▼1,071	30 June 2026	
Saudi Arabia	Asia	487,370	▼60,367	494,482	▲60,366	31 May 2026	
Hong Kong *	Asia	445,900	▲20,700	441,788	▲25,572	30 June 2026	
South Korea	Asia	427,400	▲400	423,100	▲12,200	30 June 2026	
Singapore	Asia	426,830	▲43,535	419,329	▲44,520	30 June 2026	
Brazil	Americas	366,913	▼21,658	344,173	▼361	30 Apr 2026	
Germany	Europe	345,338	▲9,863	91,071	▼9,275	1 Oct 2024	
Thailand	Asia	300,180	▲62,313	269,687	▲52,456	1 Jul 2026	
Italy	Europe	279,631	▲14,225	79,064	▲1,240	1 Nov 2024	
France	Europe	272,693	▲1,132	66,641	▲143	1 Nov 2024	
Mexico	Americas	255,605	▲1,495	236,200	▲9	30 Jan 2026	
United States	Americas	253,767	▼811	242,726	▼811	22 Aug 2025	
Israel	Asia	231,880	▲1,560	—N/a	—N/a	6 Oct 2025	
Poland	Europe	223,200	▲4,800	188,140	▲1,257	7 Jan 2025	
Turkey	Asia	218,158	▲34,137	76,585	▲12,670	30 Jan 2026	
United Arab Emirates	Asia	210,000	▲5,340	199,400	▲87	1 Nov 2024	
United Kingdom	Europe	189,228	▲4,870	161,908	▼5,910	1 Nov 2024	
Indonesia	Asia	159,246	▲3,382	—N/a	—N/a	1 Nov 2024	
Czech Republic	Europe	149,416	▼507	145,012	▼168	1 Nov 2024	
Netherlands	Europe	125,451	▲212	—N/a	—N/a	1 Mar 2024	
Canada	Americas	123,084	▼4,990	—N/a	—N/a	1 Nov 2024	
Malaysia	Asia	119,700	▲17,459	113,877	▲14,225	1 Oct 2024	
Philippines	Asia	112,434	▼328	101,081	▼41	1 Nov 2024	
Spain	Europe	100,983	▲2.380	77,348	▲2,300	1 Nov 2024	
Iraq	Asia	100,000	▼15,000	—N/a	—N/a	25 Mar 2024	
Romania	Europe	95,127	▲3,585	78,224	▲1,203	31 Jan 2026	
Vietnam	Asia	93,342	▼1,241	—N/a	—N/a	1 Mar 2024	
Denmark	Europe	93,196	▲763	88,450	▲273	1 Nov 2024	
Belgium	Europe	82,000	▲14,200	67,200	▼79	1 Mar 2024	
Norway	Europe	80,110	▲1430	—N/a	—N/a	1 Oct 2024	
Peru	Americas	73,483	▲201	—N/a	—N/a	1 Mar 2024	
Libya	Africa	70,524	▼238	—N/a	—N/a	1 Mar 2024	
Algeria	Africa	68,028	▲1,880	—N/a	—N/a	1 Mar 2024	
South Africa	Africa	67,450	▲1,186	54,862	▲143	31 Mar 2025	
Australia	Oceania	65,018	▲119	57,998	▼267	7 Nov 2024	
Qatar	Asia	64,560	▲8,931	—N/a	—N/a	1 Mar 2024	
Sweden	Europe	62,438	▼271	52,395	▼209	7 Nov 2024	
Colombia	Americas	57,269	▲124	—N/a	—N/a	8 Mar 2024	
Portugal	Europe	53,710	▼7,800	—N/a	—N/a	1 Mar 2024	
Kuwait	Asia	46,420	▲1,112	—N/a	—N/a	1 Mar 2024	
Chile	Americas	42,527	▲2,373	—N/a	—N/a	1 Mar 2024	
Hungary	Europe	41,344	▲4,749	—N/a	—N/a	1 Mar 2024	
Ukraine	Europe	40,507	▼1,212	—N/a	—N/a	1 Mar 2024	
Bangladesh	Asia	37,660	▲1552	—N/a	—N/a	03 Jul 2026	
Argentina	Americas	36,625	▼2,207	—N/a	—N/a	1 Jun 2026	
Serbia	Europe	35,770	▲4.213	—N/a	—N/a	11 Sept 2026	
Bulgaria	Europe	35,395	▼692	—N/a	—N/a	1 Mar 2024	
Egypt	Africa	35,310	▲3,161	—N/a	—N/a	1 Mar 2024	
Nigeria	Africa	34,980	▲465	—N/a	—N/a	1 Mar 2024	
Austria	Europe	34,856	▲954	34,671	▼187	1 Mar 2024	
Kazakhstan	Asia	34,500	▼938	—N/a	—N/a	1 Mar 2024	
Uzbekistan	Asia	32,195	▼950	—N/a	—N/a	1 Mar 2024	
Morocco	Africa	32,037	▲213	—N/a	—N/a	1 Mar 2024	
New Zealand	Oceania	31,712	▲1,916	—N/a	—N/a	1 Mar 2024	
Pakistan	Asia	26,791	▲3885	—N/a	—N/a	19 Sep 2026	https://www.sbp.org.pk/assets/document/forex.pdf
Iran	Asia	24,300	▲1,641	23,600	▲210	1 Mar 2024	
Macau *	Asia	24,283	▼1,566	—N/a	—N/a	1 Mar 2024	
Guatemala	Americas	21,390	▲1,300	—N/a	—N/a	1 Mar 2024	
Turkmenistan	Asia	20,600	▼45	—N/a	—N/a	1 Mar 2024	
Cambodia	Asia	18,496	▼67	—N/a	—N/a	1 Mar 2024	
Jordan	Asia	18,765	▲187	—N/a	—N/a	1 Mar 2024	
Nepal	Asia	18,400	▲1,857	—N/a	—N/a	11 Mar 2024	
Oman	Asia	16,163	▲548	—N/a	—N/a	1 Mar 2024	
Uruguay	Americas	15,449	▼1.176	15,441	▼11	1 Mar 2024	
Lebanon	Asia	14,738	▼692	—N/a	—N/a	1 Mar 2024	
Dominican Republic	Americas	14,371	▲1,145	—N/a	—N/a	1 Mar 2024	
Angola	Africa	14,200	▼40	—N/a	—N/a	15 Mar 2024	
Costa Rica	Americas	13,200	▲320	—N/a	—N/a	1 Mar 2024	
Ireland	Europe	12,599	▼130	11,874	▼2	1 Mar 2024	
Azerbaijan	Asia	11,650	▲142	—N/a	—N/a	1 Mar 2024	
Ivory Coast	Africa	9,800	▼18	—N/a	—N/a	1 Mar 2024	
Paraguay	Americas	9,707	▲805	9,168	▲7	1 Mar 2024	
North Korea	Asia	9,109	▲73	—N/a	—N/a	1 Mar 2024	
Bosnia and Herzegovina	Europe	8,711	▼391	—N/a	—N/a	1 Mar 2024	
Belarus	Europe	8,697	▲165	4,333	▲19	31 Aug 2024	
Tunisia	Africa	8,623	▲539	—N/a	—N/a	21 Mar 2024	
Finland	Europe	7,995	▼22	—N/a	—N/a	1 Mar 2024	
Slovakia	Europe	7,650	▲441	—N/a	—N/a	1 Mar 2024	
Honduras	Americas	7,390	▼580	—N/a	—N/a	21 Mar 2024	
Tanzania	Africa	7,022	▲600	—N/a	—N/a	22 Mar 2024	
Iceland	Europe	6,847	▲24	6,668	▲9	15 Mar 2024	
Myanmar	Asia	6,700	▲800	—N/a	—N/a	1 Mar 2024	
Sri Lanka	Asia	6,467	▲475	6,425	▲2	31 Oct 2024	
Panama	Americas	6,143	▼200	—N/a	—N/a	1 Mar 2024	
Venezuela	Americas	5,908	▼776	—N/a	—N/a	1 Mar 2024	
Trinidad and Tobago	Americas	5,800	▼44	—N/a	—N/a	18 Mar 2024	
Moldova	Europe	5,600	▼600	—N/a	—N/a	30 Aug 2024	
Mauritius	Africa	5,591	▼196	5,497	▼27	1 Mar 2024	
Bahrain	Asia	5,500	▲128	—N/a	—N/a	25 Mar 2024	
Albania	Europe	5,290	▼200	5,290	▲47	31 Apr 2024	
Georgia	Europe	5,224	▼25.58	—N/a	—N/a	25 Mar 2024	
Mongolia	Asia	5,120	▲500	—N/a	—N/a	20 Mar 2024	
Botswana	Africa	5,080	▼267	—N/a	—N/a	1 Mar 2024	
Jamaica	Americas	4,921	▲300	—N/a	—N/a	5 Mar 2024	
Lithuania	Europe	4,900	▼440	—N/a	—N/a	1 Mar 2024	
Vatican City	Europe	4,339	▲950	—N/a	—N/a	1 Mar 2024	
Armenia	Asia	4,298	▲600	—N/a	—N/a	25 Mar 2024	
Nicaragua	Americas	3,980	▲1,100	—N/a	—N/a	1 Mar 2024	
Greece	Europe	3,926	▲107	3,869	▼8	1 Mar 2024	
Latvia	Europe	3,913	▲13	—N/a	—N/a	1 Mar 2024	
Uganda	Africa	3,700	▼259	—N/a	—N/a	1 Mar 2024	
Andorra	Europe	3,689	▲11	—N/a	—N/a	20 Mar 2024	
Brunei	Asia	3,664	▲107	—N/a	—N/a	1 Mar 2024	
Cameroon	Africa	3,459	▼180	—N/a	—N/a	1 Mar 2024	
Ethiopia	Africa	3,430	▼170	—N/a	—N/a	1 Mar 2024	
Ghana	Africa	3,368	▲452	—N/a	—N/a	1 Mar 2024	
Ecuador	Americas	3,305	▲747	—N/a	—N/a	1 Mar 2024	
Kyrgyzstan	Asia	2,976	▲193	—N/a	—N/a	1 Mar 2024	
Croatia	Europe	2,935	▲159	—N/a	—N/a	1 Mar 2024	
Slovenia	Europe	2,519	▲62	—N/a	—N/a	1 Mar 2024	
El Salvador	Americas	2,510	▲39	—N/a	—N/a	1 Mar 2024	
Cuba	Americas	2,500	▼10,391	—N/a	—N/a	15 Mar 2024	
Kenya	Africa	2,490	▲1,073	—N/a	—N/a	5 Mar 2024	
Papua New Guinea	Oceania	2,339	▲500	—N/a	—N/a	1 Mar 2024	
Haiti	Americas	2,296	▼1,256	—N/a	—N/a	1 Mar 2024	
Estonia	Europe	2,065	▼145	—N/a	—N/a	1 Mar 2024	
Namibia	Africa	2,019	▼25	—N/a	—N/a	1 Mar 2024	
Bahamas	Americas	1,758	▲85	—N/a	—N/a	1 Mar 2024	
Bolivia	Americas	1,769	▼471	—N/a	—N/a	1 Mar 2024	
Madagascar	Africa	1,620	▲127	—N/a	—N/a	19 Mar 2024	
Montenegro	Europe	1,558	▲26	—N/a	—N/a	1 Mar 2024	
Mauritania	Africa	1,493	▲37	—N/a	—N/a	1 Mar 2024	
Tajikistan	Asia	1,482	▼19	—N/a	—N/a	1 Mar 2024	
Rwanda	Africa	1,458	▼7	—N/a	—N/a	1 Mar 2024	
Zambia	Africa	6,500	▲16	—N/a	—N/a	12 JUN 2026	
Guinea	Africa	1,425	▲33	—N/a	—N/a	15 Mar 2024	
Gabon	Africa	1,377	▼90	—N/a	—N/a	1 Mar 2024	
Cyprus	Asia	1,271	▲200	—N/a	—N/a	1 Mar 2024	
Luxembourg	Europe	1,119	▼34	—N/a	—N/a	5 Mar 2024	
Laos	Asia	1,099	▲23	—N/a	—N/a	1 Mar 2024	
Curaçao *	Americas	1,080	▲30	—N/a	—N/a	20 Mar 2024	
Fiji	Oceania	1,065	▲22	—N/a	—N/a	5 Mar 2024	
Niger	Africa	1,053	▲24	—N/a	—N/a	1 Mar 2024	
Aruba *	Americas	1,017	▲30	—N/a	—N/a	15 Mar 2024	
Bhutan	Asia	972	▼3	—N/a	—N/a	10 Mar 2024	
Kosovo *	Europe	950	▼15	—N/a	—N/a	1 Mar 2024	
Malta	Europe	937	▲9	—N/a	—N/a	20 Mar 2024	
Lesotho	Africa	785	▲11	—N/a	—N/a	1 Mar 2024	
Barbados	Americas	770	▼2	—N/a	—N/a	1 Mar 2024	
San Marino	Europe	716	▲243	—N/a	—N/a	1 Mar 2024	
Cape Verde	Africa	712	▼25	—N/a	—N/a	1 Mar 2024	
Gambia	Africa	698	▲6	—N/a	—N/a	1 Mar 2024	
Palestine *	Asia	671	▼12	—N/a	—N/a	1 Mar 2024	
Timor-Leste	Asia	654	▼2	—N/a	—N/a	1 Mar 2024	
Suriname	Americas	647	▲30	—N/a	—N/a	8 Mar 2024	
Maldives	Asia	644	▲6	—N/a	—N/a	1 September 2026	
Sierra Leone	Africa	624	▼2	—N/a	—N/a	2 Mar 2024	
Mali	Africa	604	▼19	—N/a	—N/a	1 Mar 2024	
Guyana	Americas	553	▼20	—N/a	—N/a	10 Mar 2024	
Solomon Islands	Oceania	551	▲24	—N/a	—N/a	8 Mar 2024	
Seychelles	Africa	546	▼19	—N/a	—N/a	1 Mar 2024	
Vanuatu	Oceania	509	▼2	—N/a	—N/a	1 Mar 2024	
Democratic Republic of the Congo	Africa	505	▼160	—N/a	—N/a	14 Mar 2024	
Djibouti	Africa	504	▲3	—N/a	—N/a	1 Mar 2024	
Malawi	Africa	488	▲17	—N/a	—N/a	1 Mar 2024	
Eswatini	Africa	467	▲27	—N/a	—N/a	1 Mar 2024	
Afghanistan	Asia	443	▼32	—N/a	—N/a	1 Oct 2024	
Republic of the Congo	Africa	443	▲20	—N/a	—N/a	1 Mar 2024	
Syria	Asia	401	▼16	—N/a	—N/a	1 Mar 2024	
Federated States of Micronesia	Oceania	395	▼2	—N/a	—N/a	1 Mar 2024	
Central African Republic	Africa	375	▲14	—N/a	—N/a	1 Mar 2024	
Saint Kitts and Nevis	Americas	365	▼14	—N/a	—N/a	1 Mar 2024	
Liberia	Africa	342	▼7	—N/a	—N/a	1 Mar 2024	
Guinea-Bissau	Africa	329	▼3	—N/a	—N/a	1 Mar 2024	
Antigua and Barbuda	Americas	285	▲6	—N/a	—N/a	1 Mar 2024	
Belize	Americas	281	▲4	—N/a	—N/a	1 Mar 2024	
Saint Lucia *	Americas	258	▼2	—N/a	—N/a	1 Mar 2024	
Yemen	Asia	250	▲5	—N/a	—N/a	1 Mar 2024	
Grenada	Americas	247	▲11	—N/a	—N/a	1 Mar 2024	
Tonga	Oceania	226	▼3	—N/a	—N/a	1 Mar 2024	
Togo	Africa	208	▼7	—N/a	—N/a	1 Mar 2024	
Comoros	Africa	197	▼5	—N/a	—N/a	1 Mar 2024	
Saint Vincent and the Grenadines *	Americas	192	▼1	—N/a	—N/a	1 Mar 2024	
Eritrea	Africa	189	▼2	—N/a	—N/a	1 Mar 2024	
Samoa	Oceania	188	▲3	—N/a	—N/a	1 Mar 2024	
São Tomé and Príncipe	Africa	186	▲2	—N/a	—N/a	1 Mar 2024	
Sudan	Africa	172	▼5	—N/a	—N/a	1 Mar 2024	
Dominica	Americas	168	▲6	—N/a	—N/a	1 Mar 2024	
Senegal	Africa	164	▲12	—N/a	—N/a	1 Mar 2024	
Zimbabwe	Africa	159	▲8	—N/a	—N/a	1 Mar 2024	
Chad	Africa	143	▼4	—N/a	—N/a	1 Mar 2024	
Burundi	Africa	105	▼6	—N/a	—N/a	1 Mar 2024	
South Sudan	Africa	80	▲7	—N/a	—N/a	2 Mar 2024	
Benin	Africa	69	▲9	—N/a	—N/a	1 Mar 2024	
Montserrat	Americas	54	▲5	—N/a	—N/a	1 Mar 2024	
Equatorial Guinea	Africa	46	▼2	—N/a	—N/a	1 Mar 2024	
Burkina Faso	Africa	42	▼3	—N/a	—N/a	1 Mar 2024	
Somalia	Africa	37	▲5	—N/a	—N/a	1 Mar 2024	
Kiribati	Oceania	8	▲2	—N/a	—N/a	1 Mar 2024	
Mozambique	Africa	4	▲0.8	—N/a	—N/a	31 Jul 2025	
North Macedonia	Europe	4	▲0.1	—N/a	—N/a	31 Aug 2025	

== Top 5 forex reserves holders ==
Top five countries with the largest foreign exchange reserves have reserves of at least 500 billion USD and higher and have maintained such an amount for at least a month.

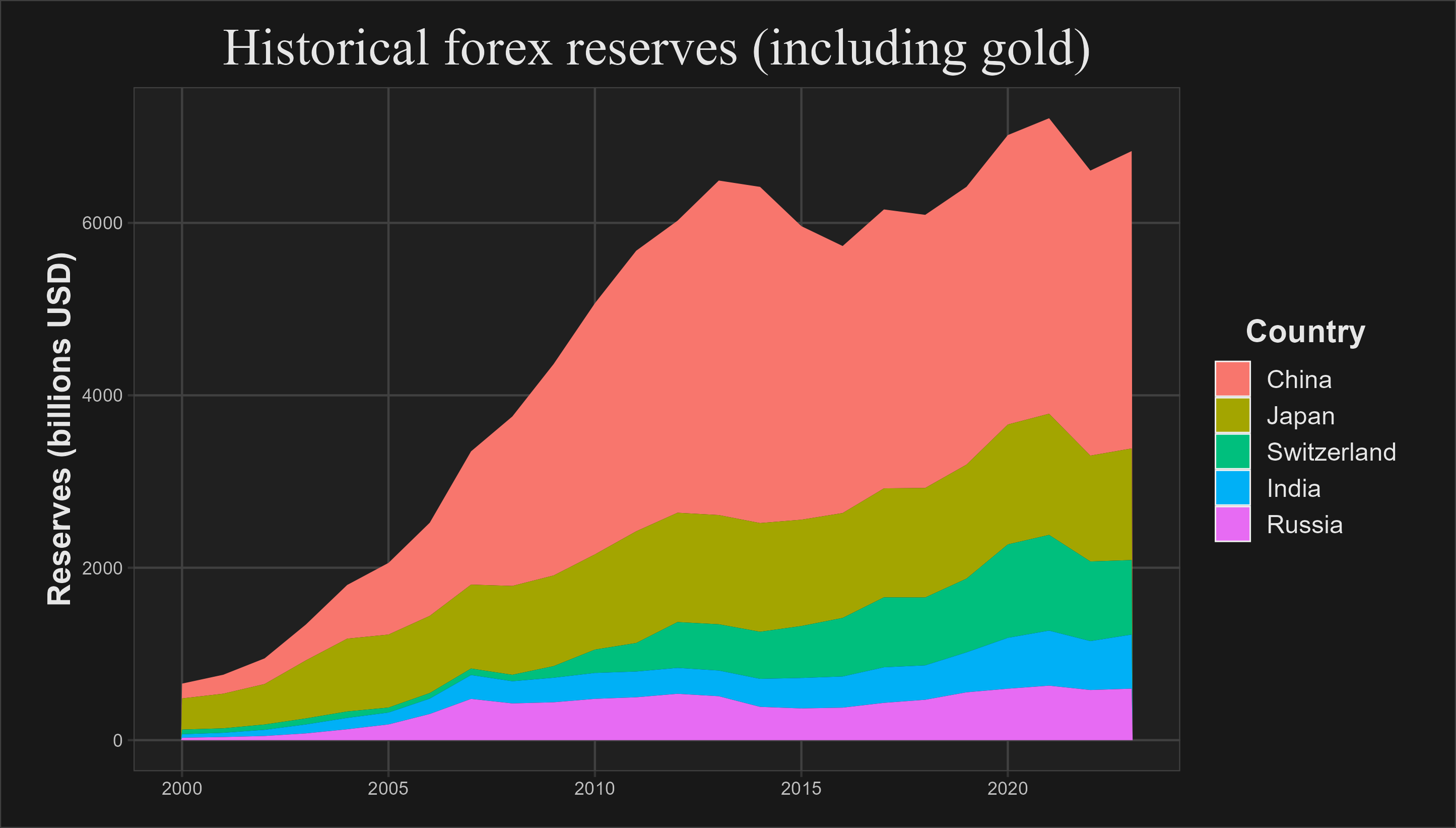
Foreign exchange reserves for the top 5 countries

=== China ===
China has had the largest reserves for the last 14 years. Chinese forex reserves are made up of about two-thirds USD and one-fifth Euros, with the rest made up of Japanese Yen and the British Pound. China was the second country to reach $500 billion and the first to reach $1 trillion in reserves. China is also the only country that has reached net reserves of $2 trillion and $3 trillion. Chinese forex reserves reached over $3.993 trillion and possibly reached $4 trillion before July 2014, but there were no official figures to confirm it.

=== Japan ===
As of 2024, Japan holds one of the largest foreign exchange reserves globally—estimated between $1.2 trillion and $1.3 trillion—second only to China. Managed by the Bank of Japan (BOJ), these reserves are vital to the country's financial stability, supporting the yen, facilitating trade and investment, and serving as a buffer against economic shocks. Japan's reserves are highly diversified, consisting mainly of foreign currency assets such as U.S. dollars, euros, British pounds, and Australian dollars. A substantial portion is invested in U.S. Treasury securities, offering liquidity and returns. While Japan holds a relatively small proportion of gold—around 765 tons—it still considers it a traditional store of value. The country also holds Special Drawing Rights (SDRs), an IMF-backed international reserve asset. Japan’s reserve strategy has evolved over time, influenced by a deflationary domestic environment and global economic changes. Although the U.S. dollar remains dominant in Japan’s portfolio, the BOJ has gradually diversified into other currencies, including limited exposure to the Chinese yuan. Japan’s reserves have historically grown due to large trade surpluses, particularly with the U.S. and Asian markets. These reserves play a key role in stabilizing the yen and maintaining economic resilience amid shifting global conditions, such as changes in U.S. monetary policy or the rise of China in global trade. Overall, Japan’s foreign exchange reserves remain a cornerstone of its economic policy, aimed at ensuring liquidity, stability, and adaptability in a complex and interconnected global financial system.

=== Switzerland ===
Switzerland has the third largest reserves in the world. Switzerland became the fifth country to reach $500 billion in 2014 after Saudi Arabia and the third country to reach $1 trillion at the end of 2020. Swiss reserves are compiled in Swiss francs. After the 2008 financial crisis, the Swiss franc has significantly appreciated against other currencies due to Switzerland's historical perceived safety which has attracted speculative foreign capital; due to the inflows of investment income by Swiss firms, and due to the large surplus in the trade of goods. To protect the real economy from the sudden speculative appreciation of the currency, the Swiss National Bank began intervening in the currency markets, first with an explicit target of a maximum exchange rate against the euro of 1.20CHF/EUR until 2015, and then through implicit interventions. However, the resilience of the export sector and the continued inflows of capital, has meant that the Swiss Franc has kept appreciating. As a result of this, the SNB has been unable to dispose of its large accumulated foreign exchange reserves since their sale would lead to an even greater appreciation of the currency.

=== India ===
India has the world's fourth largest reserves. On 4 June 2021 reserves exceeded $600 billion for the first time and they became the fifth country after Switzerland to do so. During the 1991 Indian economic crisis country only had $5 billion of reserves left which led to subsequent economic liberalisation. Since then the reserves have seen a 127 times increase over 30 years. In April 2024, Foreign-exchange reserves of India hit a fresh all-time high of $642.63 including 803.58 tons of gold reserves. Out of which 403.7 tons of gold is held with Bank of England and Bank for International Settlements, and rest is held domestically. It is done to provide a sense of security and to ensure diversification of risk by spreading gold holdings across multiple locations. In May 2024, India decided to move all of its gold holding with the Bank of England to its domestic vaults, the first batch of 100 metric tonnes of its gold was moved back to India on 31 May 2024. This decision was primarily taken due to the West's unexpected sanctions during the Ukraine war on roughly $300 billion worth of Russian gold kept in various European countries, which caused a sense of insecurity within the Indian government and economic experts.

=== Russia ===
As of 2024, Russia’s foreign exchange reserves remain a crucial element of its financial stability, comprising foreign currencies, gold, and other liquid assets managed by the Central Bank of Russia. Prior to its 2022 invasion of Ukraine, Russia had accumulated over $600 billion in reserves as a safeguard against economic shocks. However, following the invasion, Western nations imposed severe sanctions, including freezing approximately $300 billion of these reserves held in the U.S. and Europe. In response, Russia shifted its strategy to reduce reliance on Western financial systems. It increased its gold reserves—considered a secure asset not subject to the same sanctions as currencies—and diversified into non-Western currencies, particularly the Chinese yuan. This shift aligned with Russia’s broader move to strengthen economic ties with countries in Asia, Africa, and the Middle East, many of which are more open to using alternative currencies in trade. By 2024, Russia’s reserves were estimated between $570 billion and $600 billion, with a significant share in gold, yuan, Indian rupee and other non-traditional assets. The composition of these reserves continues to fluctuate due to changes in exchange rates and asset valuations. These diversified reserves help Russia stabilize the ruble, meet foreign debt obligations, and maintain the ability to intervene in currency markets when necessary. By reducing dependence on Western assets and financial infrastructure, Russia has bolstered its economic resilience and geopolitical independence in the face of ongoing sanctions and global financial pressures.

== Currency composition of forex reserves ==
The Currency Composition of Foreign Exchange Reserves (COFER) refers to the breakdown of the foreign exchange reserves held by central banks around the world, based on the currencies in which those reserves are denominated. These reserves are typically held in the form of deposits, bonds, and other liquid assets, and they play a critical role in managing a country's exchange rate policy, stabilizing its currency, and meeting international financial obligations. IMF releases the quarterly data on the currency composition of official foreign exchange reserves. The data are reported to the IMF on a voluntary and confidential basis. COFER data for individual countries are strictly confidential. At present there are 149 reporters, (Note: 149 COFER participant countries are Afghanistan, Albania, Algeria, Andorra, Angola, Antigua and Barbuda, Argentina, Armenia, Australia, Austria, Azerbaijan, Bahamas, Bahrain, Bangladesh, Barbados, Belarus, Belgium, Belize, Benin, Bhutan, Bolivia, Bosnia and Herzegovina, Botswana, Brazil, Brunei Darussalam, Bulgaria, Burkina Faso, Burundi, Cabo Verde, Cambodia, Cameroon, Canada, Central African Republic, Chad, Chile, China, Colombia, Comoros, Congo (Congo-Brazzaville), Costa Rica, Croatia, Cuba, Cyprus, Czech Republic, Democratic Republic of the Congo (DRC), Denmark, Djibouti, Dominica, Dominican Republic, East Timor (Timor-Leste), Ecuador, Egypt, El Salvador, Equatorial Guinea, Eritrea, Estonia, Eswatini, Ethiopia, Fiji, Finland, France, Gabon, Gambia, Georgia, Germany, Ghana, Greece, Grenada, Guatemala, Guinea, Guinea-Bissau, Guyana, Haiti, Honduras, Hungary, Iceland, India, Indonesia, Iran, Iraq, Ireland, Israel, Italy, Ivory Coast (Côte d'Ivoire), Jamaica, Japan, Jordan, Kazakhstan, Kenya, Kiribati, Korea, Democratic People's Republic of (North Korea), Korea, Republic of (South Korea), Kuwait, Kyrgyzstan, Laos, Latvia, Lebanon, Lesotho, Liberia, Libya, Liechtenstein, Lithuania, Luxembourg, Madagascar, Malawi, Malaysia, Maldives, Mali, Malta, Marshall Islands, Mauritania, Mauritius, Mexico, Micronesia (Federated States of), Moldova, Monaco, Mongolia, Montenegro, Morocco, Mozambique, Myanmar (Burma), Namibia, Nauru, Nepal, Netherlands, New Zealand, Nicaragua, Niger, Nigeria, North Macedonia, Norway, Oman, Pakistan, Palau, Panama, Papua New Guinea, Paraguay, Peru, Philippines, Poland, Portugal, Qatar, Romania, Rwanda, Saint Kitts and Nevis, Saint Lucia, Saint Vincent and the Grenadines, Samoa, San Marino, Sao Tome and Principe.) consisting of member countries of the IMF, non-member countries/economies, and other foreign exchanges reserve holding entities. From Q4 2016, the data was expanded to include renminbi (CNY). Monetary gold is not covered in COFER but included in reserved assets, a broader scope than that of COFER.

Currency composition of foreign exchange reserves (COFER) (billion US$)
Calendar quarter		(United States) USD	(European Union) EUR	(Japan) JPY	(United Kingdom) GBP	(Canada) CAD	(China) CNY	(Australia) AUD	(Switzerland) CHF	Other currencies	Unallocated reserves	Total
2019	Q1	6,727.09	2,208.79	584.63	495.70	208.64	212.26	181.95	15.27	263.50	712.93	11,610.77
2019	Q2	6,752.28	2,264.88	611.87	497.41	209.85	212.80	186.71	15.53	270.56	715.88	11,737.76
2019	Q3	6,728.85	2,212.74	612.75	492.22	205.44	213.83	182.48	16.20	262.92	729.40	11,656.82
2019	Q4	6,674.83	2,279.30	631.00	511.51	206.71	215.81	187.18	17.36	281.50	749.55	11,824.74
2020	Q1	6,794.91	2,197.30	624.97	486.08	195.13	221.48	170.16	16.05	255.53	770.32	11,731.94
2020	Q2	6,902.01	2,272.44	643.70	504.36	215.47	233.68	190.34	17.22	278.67	754.11	12,011.98
2020	Q3	6,927.16	2,359.61	668.19	523.64	231.10	247.44	199.51	19.30	283.16	787.44	12,246.56
2020	Q4	6,990.97	2,526.41	715.35	561.39	246.57	271.60	216.87	20.74	314.63	841.14	12,705.67
2021	Q1	6,971.79	2,404.80	686.30	554.28	250.01	293.32	214.89	19.44	335.82	851.50	12,582.14
2021	Q2	7,070.33	2,458.88	672.20	560.90	270.01	314.81	218.44	23.13	357.57	865.83	12,812.12
2021	Q3	7,087.77	2,462.44	681.42	561.66	264.29	320.15	214.26	23.77	354.77	860.67	12,831.20
2021	Q4	7,087.14	2,486.88	671.77	576.22	286.93	336.10	218.02	24.51	362.96	886.73	12,937.27
2022	Q1	6,868.97	2,328.35	626.44	569.45	286.02	330.03	221.91	29.48	387.80	858.65	12,507.09
2022	Q2	6,645.02	2,187.63	572.65	538.73	275.75	308.22	209.14	27.63	358.62	858.26	11,981.65
2022	Q3	6,426.89	2,086.40	560.11	489.95	260.92	281.12	204.78	24.78	358.59	841.74	11,535.29
2022	Q4	6,460.21	2,252.06	608.17	543.11	262.62	287.81	217.08	25.31	383.64	877.79	11,917.81
2023	Q1	6,630.89	2,186.33	610.39	605.02	270.60	287.12	221.62	28.26	389.07	877.53	12,029.03
2023	Q2	6,641.89	2,207.25	597.15	533.64	278.51	272.99	219.70	21.26	403.72	887.06	12,055.26
2023	Q3	6,497.94	2,150.47	598.73	530.36	274.36	260.12	222.35	20.30	426.63	920.27	11,901.53
2023	Q4	6,687.11	2,287.57	652.90	553.91	295.25	261.73	241.78	26.38	442.77	883.06	12,332.46
2024	Q1	6,774.82	2,253.79	654.52	562.48	295.64	247.10	248.42	21.93	439.56	885.35	12,383.61
2024	Q2	6,675.82	2,265.29	641.07	565.92	306.85	245.17	256.45	22.43	486.89	881.90	12,347.42
2024	Q3	6,786.40	2,372.30	690.00	589.70	324.40	257.80	268.70	19.80	534.70	905.90	12,750.11
2024	Q4	6,631.30	2,275.90	667.10	542.40	317.90	249.60	235.90	19.70	532.80	892.10	12,364.11
2025	Q1	6,720.31	2,334.61	599.09	603.70	306.13	246.31	235.27	20.85	573.41	898.61	11,639.72
2025	Q2	6,773.33	2,540.42	670.07	580.23	313.82	255.37	250.93	19.54	621.70	919.30	12,944.76
2025	Q3											
2025	Q4											

Forex reserve share by currencies
1. Claims in USD (60.8%)
2. Claims in EUR (20.8%)
3. Claims in JPY (5.90%)
4. Claims in GBP (5.00%)
5. Claims in CAD (2.70%)
6. Claims in CNY (2.40%)
7. Claims in AUD (2.20%)
8. Claims in CHF (0.20%)

=== Key components of COFER ===
The U.S. dollar remains the dominant currency in global foreign exchange reserves, typically accounting for around 60% to 65% of total reserves, although this share has seen some gradual decline over the past few decades due to diversification trends. The euro is the second-largest currency held in reserves, making up around 20% to 25% of global reserves. The share of the euro fluctuates based on factors like the European Union's economic stability and the policies of the European Central Bank. The Chinese yuan (also known as the renminbi) has been increasingly used in foreign reserves, particularly after China became a part of the International Monetary Fund's Special Drawing Rights (SDR) basket in 2016. Its share is still relatively small compared to the USD and EUR, typically around 2% to 3%. The Japanese yen is another significant reserve currency, though its share is typically lower than the euro or yuan, usually around 4% to 5%. The British pound sterling holds a smaller but still notable portion of global reserves, typically around 4% to 5%. Several other currencies, such as the Swiss franc (CHF), Canadian dollar (CAD), and Australian dollar (AUD), also make up a small but significant portion of foreign reserves. However, none of these currencies surpass the USD, EUR, or JPY in terms of global reserves. The SDR is an international reserve asset created by the International Monetary Fund (IMF). It is not a currency but rather a potential claim on the freely usable currencies of IMF member countries. The SDR basket includes the U.S. dollar, euro, Chinese yuan, Japanese yen, and British pound. While SDRs are not used as widely as the major currencies, some countries include them in their reserves.

=== Trends and shifts in currency composition ===
In recent years, many central banks have diversified their foreign exchange reserves away from the U.S. dollar, driven by geopolitical risks, the desire to reduce dependency on the dollar, and the increasing importance of the Chinese yuan. However, this shift has been gradual, and the USD continues to dominate. Major events, such as the 2008 financial crisis, the COVID-19 pandemic, and fluctuations in global trade patterns, have affected how countries allocate their foreign exchange reserves. For example, during periods of heightened uncertainty, central banks may increase their reserves in safe-haven currencies like the U.S. dollar and the Swiss franc. China's increasing global economic influence has prompted a rise in the use of the yuan for trade and reserve purposes. The International Monetary Fund's inclusion of the yuan in the SDR basket in 2016 further legitimized its use as a global reserve currency.

=== Why the composition matters ===
The currency composition of foreign exchange reserves affects global financial markets, interest rates, and currency valuations. A high concentration in a single currency (especially the U.S. dollar) can lead to vulnerabilities in times of global economic stress. Conversely, diversification into other currencies may provide greater stability but also presents challenges in terms of liquidity and market depth. For example, during the early stages of the COVID-19 pandemic, many countries increased their foreign exchange reserves to prepare for potential financial disruptions, and the U.S. dollar surged temporarily as investors sought safety. However, over time, countries may seek to reduce their reliance on the U.S. dollar, especially if they are concerned about inflationary pressures or geopolitical risks linked to U.S. policy.

== See also ==
- List of circulating currencies
- List of countries by gold holdings
- List of countries by GDP (nominal)
- List of countries by GDP (PPP) per capita
- List of countries by GDP (nominal) per capita
- Foreign-exchange reserves of China
- Foreign-exchange reserves of India
- International reserves of Russia
