= Financial Transactions Plan =

The Financial Transactions Plan of the International Monetary Fund is the mechanism through which the Fund finances its lending and repayment operations, to its members, in the General Resources Account. It was formerly called the operational budget.

The members of the Fund can take loans from the IMF with limits corresponding to their quota. IMF lends to its members in both foreign exchange and SDRs. Credit extended in foreign exchange is financed from the quota resources made available to the IMF by members. The creditor benefits as their position increases. When extending credit in SDRs, the IMF transfers reserve assets directly to borrowing members by drawing on the IMF's own holdings of SDRs in the General Resources Account.

== See also ==
- Reserve Tranche Position
- Enhanced structural adjustment facility
