= Foreign exchange reserves =

Money held by a central bank to pay debts, if needed

Foreign exchange reserves (also called forex reserves or FX reserves) are cash and other reserve assets such as gold and silver held by a central bank or other monetary authority that are primarily available to balance payments of the country, influence the foreign exchange rate of its currency, and to maintain confidence in financial markets. Reserves are held in one or more reserve currencies, mostly the United States dollar and to a lesser extent the euro.

Foreign exchange reserves assets can comprise banknotes, bank deposits, and government securities of the reserve currency, such as bonds and treasury bills. Some countries hold a part of their reserves in gold, and special drawing rights are also considered reserve assets. Often, for convenience, the cash or securities are retained by the central bank of the reserve or other currency and the "holdings" of the foreign country are tagged or otherwise identified as belonging to the other country without them actually leaving the vault of that central bank. From time to time they may be physically moved to the home or another country.

Normally, interest is not paid on foreign cash reserves, nor on gold holdings, but the central bank usually earns interest on government securities. The central bank may, however, profit from a depreciation of the foreign currency or incur a loss on its appreciation. The central bank also incurs opportunity costs from holding the reserve assets (especially cash holdings) and from their storage, security costs, etc.

== Definition ==
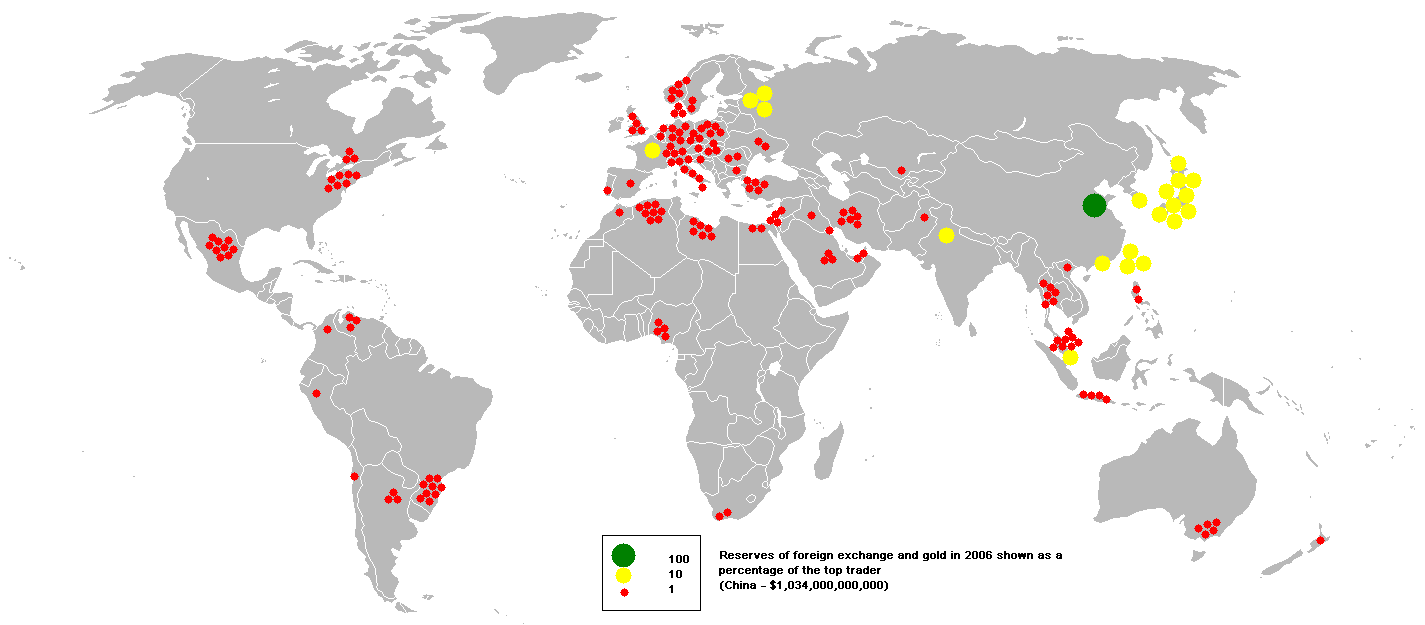
Reserves of SDRs, forex and gold in 2006

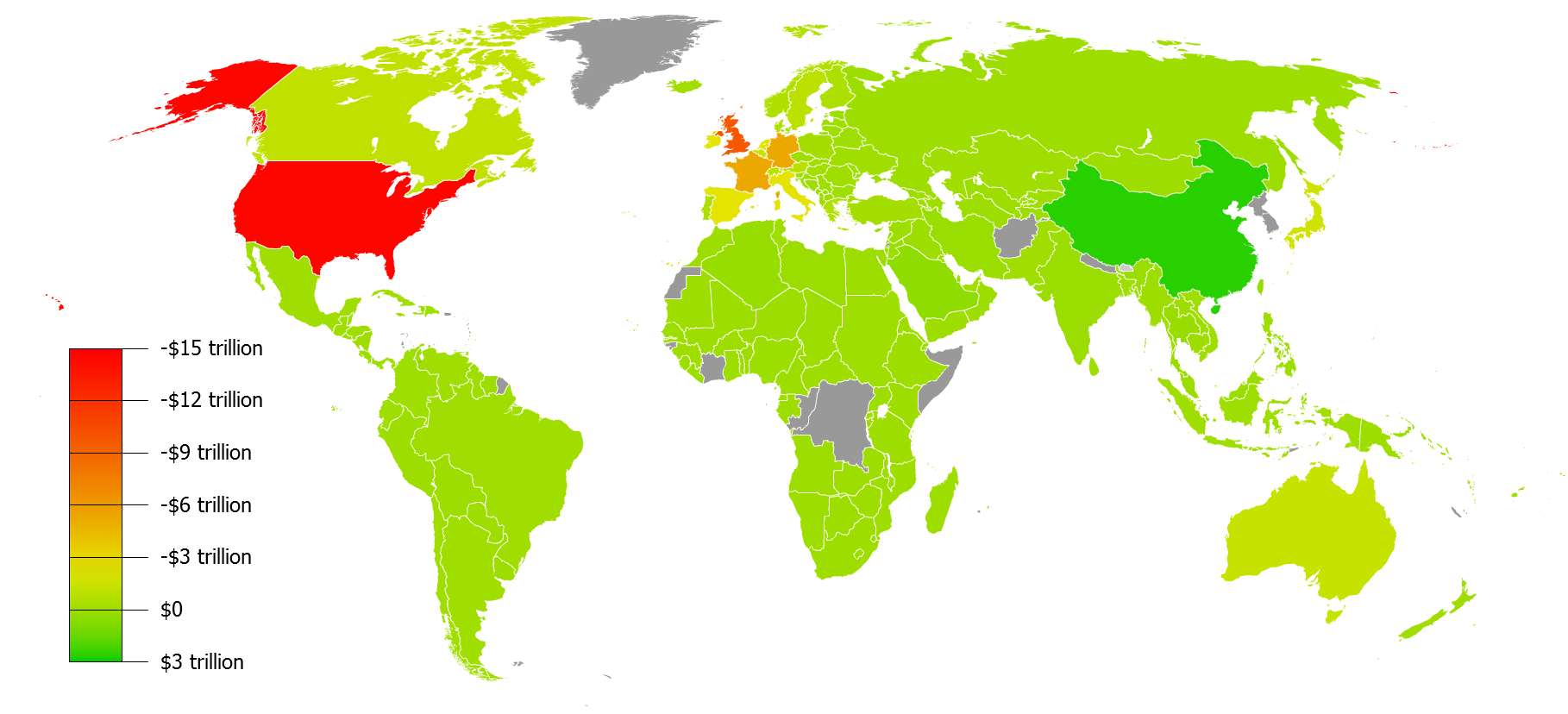
Foreign exchange reserves minus external debt in 2011

Foreign exchange reserves are also known as reserve assets and include foreign banknotes, foreign bank deposits, foreign treasury bills, and short and long-term foreign government securities, as well as gold reserves, special drawing rights (SDRs), and International Monetary Fund (IMF) reserve positions.

In a central bank's accounts, foreign exchange reserves are called reserve assets in the capital account of the balance of payments, and may be labeled as reserve assets under assets by functional category. In terms of financial assets classifications, reserve assets can be classified as gold bullion, unallocated gold accounts, special drawing rights, currency, reserve position in the IMF, interbank position, other transferable deposits, other deposits, debt securities, loans, company shares (listed and unlisted), investment fund shares and other financial contracts. There is no counterpart for reserve assets in liabilities of the international investment position. Usually, when the monetary authority of a country has some kind of liability, this will be included in other categories, such as "other investments". On a central bank's balance sheet, foreign exchange reserves are assets, along with domestic credit.

== Purpose ==
Currency composition of official foreign exchange reserves (2000-2019), in trillions of U.S. dollars

Typically, one of the critical functions of a country's central bank is reserve management, to ensure that the central bank has control over adequate foreign assets to meet national objectives. These objectives may include:

- supporting and maintaining confidence in the national monetary and exchange rate management policies,
- limiting external vulnerability to shocks during times of crisis or when access to borrowing is curtailed, and in doing so -
  - providing a level of confidence to markets,
  - demonstrating backing for the domestic currency,
  - assisting the government to meet its foreign exchange needs and external debt obligations, and
  - maintaining a reserve for potential national disasters or emergencies.

Reserves assets allow a central bank to purchase the domestic currency, which is considered a liability for the central bank (since it prints the money or fiat currency as IOUs). Thus, the quantity of foreign exchange reserves can change as a central bank implements monetary policy, but this dynamic should be analyzed generally in the context of the level of capital mobility, the exchange rate regime and other factors. This is known as trilemma or impossible trinity. Hence, in a world of perfect capital mobility, a country with fixed exchange rate would not be able to execute an independent monetary policy.

A central bank which chooses to implement a fixed exchange rate policy may face a situation where supply and demand would tend to push the value of the currency lower or higher (an increase in demand for the currency would tend to push its value higher, and a decrease lower) and thus the central bank would have to use reserves to maintain its fixed exchange rate. Under perfect capital mobility, the change in reserves is a temporary measure, since the fixed exchange rate attaches the domestic monetary policy to that of the country of the base currency. Hence, in the long term, the monetary policy has to be adjusted in order to be compatible with that of the country of the base currency. Without that, the country will experience outflows or inflows of capital. Fixed pegs were usually used as a form of monetary policy, since attaching the domestic currency to a currency of a country with lower levels of inflation should usually assure convergence of prices.

In a pure flexible exchange rate regime or floating exchange rate regime, the central bank does not intervene in the exchange rate dynamics; hence the exchange rate is determined by the market. Theoretically, in this case reserves are not necessary. Other instruments of monetary policy are generally used, such as interest rates in the context of an inflation targeting regime. Milton Friedman was a strong advocate of flexible exchange rates, since he considered that independent monetary (and in some cases fiscal) policy and openness of the capital account are more valuable than a fixed exchange rate. Also, he valued the role of exchange rate as a price. As a matter of fact, he believed that sometimes it could be less painful and thus desirable to adjust only one price (the exchange rate) than the whole set of prices of goods and wages of the economy, that are less flexible.

Mixed exchange rate regimes ('dirty floats', target bands or similar variations) may require the use of foreign exchange operations to maintain the targeted exchange rate within the prescribed limits, such as fixed exchange rate regimes. As seen above, there is an intimate relation between exchange rate policy (and hence reserves accumulation) and monetary policy. Foreign exchange operations can be sterilized (have their effect on the money supply negated via other financial transactions) or unsterilized.

Non-sterilization will cause an expansion or contraction in the amount of domestic currency in circulation, and hence directly affect inflation and monetary policy. For example, to maintain the same exchange rate if there is increased demand, the central bank can issue more of the domestic currency and purchase foreign currency, which will increase the sum of foreign reserves. Since (if there is no sterilization) the domestic money supply is increasing (money is being 'printed'), this may provoke domestic inflation. Also, some central banks may let the exchange rate appreciate to control inflation, usually by the channel of cheapening tradable goods.

Since the amount of foreign reserves available to defend a weak currency (a currency in low demand) is limited, a currency crisis or devaluation could be the result. For a currency in very high and rising demand, foreign exchange reserves can theoretically be continuously accumulated, if the intervention is sterilized through open market operations to prevent inflation from rising. On the other hand, this is costly, since the sterilization is usually done by public debt instruments (in some countries Central Banks are not allowed to emit debt by themselves). In practice, few central banks or currency regimes operate on such a simplistic level, and numerous other factors (domestic demand, production and productivity, imports and exports, relative prices of goods and services, etc.) will affect the eventual outcome. Besides that, the hypothesis that the world economy operates under perfect capital mobility is clearly flawed.

As a consequence, even those central banks that strictly limit foreign exchange interventions often recognize that currency markets can be volatile and may intervene to counter disruptive short-term movements (that may include speculative attacks). Thus, intervention does not mean that they are defending a specific exchange rate level. Hence, the higher the reserves, the higher is the capacity of the central bank to smooth the volatility of the Balance of Payments and assure consumption smoothing in the long term.

== Reserve accumulation ==
After the end of the Bretton Woods system in the early 1970s, many countries adopted flexible exchange rates. In theory reserves are not needed under this type of exchange rate arrangement; thus the expected trend should be a decline in foreign exchange reserves. However, the opposite happened and foreign reserves present a strong upward trend. Reserves grew more than gross domestic product (GDP) and imports in many countries. The only ratio that is relatively stable is foreign reserves over M2. Below are some theories that can explain this trend.

=== Theories ===
==== Signaling or vulnerability indicator ====
Credit risk agencies and international organizations use ratios of reserves to other external sector variables to assess a country's external vulnerability. For example, Article IV of 2013 uses total external debt to gross international reserves, gross international reserves in months of prospective goods and nonfactor services imports to broad money, broad money to short-term external debt, and short-term external debt to short-term external debt on residual maturity basis plus current account deficit. Therefore, countries with similar characteristics accumulate reserves to avoid negative assessment by the financial market, especially when compared to members of a peer group.

==== Precautionary aspect ====
Reserves are used as savings for potential times of crises, especially balance of payments crises. Original fears were related to the current account, but this gradually changed to also include financial account needs. Furthermore, the creation of the IMF was viewed as a response to the need of countries to accumulate reserves. If a specific country is suffering from a balance of payments crisis, it would be able to borrow from the IMF. However, the process of obtaining resources from the Fund is not automatic, which can cause problematic delays especially when markets are stressed. Therefore, the fund only serves as a provider of resources for longer term adjustments. Also, when the crisis is generalized, the resources of the IMF could prove insufficient. After the 2008 crisis, the members of the Fund had to approve a capital increase, since its resources were strained. Moreover, after the 1997 Asian crisis, reserves in Asian countries increased because of doubt in the IMF reserves. Also, during the 2008 crisis, the Federal Reserve instituted currency swap lines with several countries, alleviating liquidity pressures in dollars, thus reducing the need to use reserves.

===== External trade =====
Countries engaging in international trade, maintain reserves to ensure no interruption. A rule usually followed by central banks is to hold in reserve at least three months of imports. Also, an increase in reserves occurred when commercial openness increased (part of the process known as globalization). Reserve accumulation was faster than that which would be explained by trade, since the ratio has increased to several months of imports. Furthermore, the ratio of reserves to foreign trade is closely watched by credit risk agencies in months of imports.

===== Financial openness =====
The opening of a financial account of the balance of payments has been important during the last decade. Hence, financial flows such as direct investment and portfolio investment became more important. Usually financial flows are more volatile that enforce the necessity of higher reserves. Moreover, holding reserves, as a consequence of the increasing of financial flows, is known as Guidotti–Greenspan rule that states a country should hold liquid reserves equal to their foreign liabilities coming due within a year. For example, international wholesale financing relied more on Korean banks in the aftermath of the 2008 crisis, when the Korean Won depreciated strongly, because the Korean banks' ratio of short-term external debt to reserves was close to 100%, which exacerbated the perception of vulnerability.

==== Exchange rate policy ====
Reserve accumulation can be an instrument to interfere with the exchange rate. Since the first General Agreement on Tariffs and Trade (GATT) of 1948 to the foundation of the World Trade Organization (WTO) in 1995, the regulation of trade is a major concern for most countries throughout the world. Hence, commercial distortions such as subsidies and taxes are strongly discouraged. However, there is no global framework to regulate financial flows. As an example of regional framework, members of the European Union are prohibited from introducing capital controls, except in an extraordinary situation. The dynamics of China's trade balance and reserve accumulation during the first decade of the 2000 was one of the main reasons for the interest in this topic. Some economists are trying to explain this behavior. Usually, the explanation is based on a sophisticated variation of mercantilism, such as to protect the take-off in the tradable sector of an economy, by avoiding the real exchange rate appreciation that would naturally arise from this process. One attempt uses a standard model of open economy intertemporal consumption to show that it is possible to replicate a tariff on imports or a subsidy on exports by closing the capital account and accumulating reserves. Another is more related to the economic growth literature. The argument is that the tradable sector of an economy is more capital intense than the non-tradable sector. The private sector invests too little in capital, since it fails to understand the social gains of a higher capital ratio given by externalities (like improvements in human capital, higher competition, technological spillovers and increasing returns to scale). The government could improve the equilibrium by imposing subsidies and tariffs, but the hypothesis is that the government is unable to distinguish between good investment opportunities and rent-seeking schemes. Thus, reserves accumulation would correspond to a loan to foreigners to purchase a quantity of tradable goods from the economy. In this case, the real exchange rate would depreciate and the growth rate would increase. In some cases, this could improve welfare, since the higher growth rate would compensate the loss of the tradable goods that could be consumed or invested. In this context, foreigners have the role to choose only the useful tradable goods sectors.

==== Intergenerational savings ====
Reserve accumulation can be seen as a way of "forced savings". The government, by closing the financial account, would force the private sector to buy domestic debt for lack of better alternatives. With these resources, the government buys foreign assets. Thus, the government coordinates the savings accumulation in the form of reserves. Sovereign wealth funds are examples of governments that try to save the windfall of booming exports as long-term assets to be used when the source of the windfall is extinguished.

=== Costs ===
There are costs in maintaining large currency reserves. Fluctuations in exchange rates result in gains and losses in the value of reserves. In addition, the purchasing power of fiat money decreases constantly due to devaluation through inflation. Therefore, a central bank must continually increase the amount of its reserves to maintain the same power to manage exchange rates. Reserves of foreign currency may provide a small return in interest. However, this may be less than the reduction in purchasing power of that currency over the same period of time due to inflation, effectively resulting in a negative return known as the "quasi-fiscal cost". In addition, large currency reserves could have been invested in higher yielding assets.

Several calculations have been attempted to measure the cost of reserves. The traditional one is the spread between government debt and the yield on reserves. The caveat is that higher reserves can decrease the perception of risk and thus the government bond interest rate, so this measures can overstate the cost. Alternatively, another measure compares the yield in reserves with the alternative scenario of the resources being invested in capital stock to the economy, which is hard to measure. One interesting measure tries to compare the spread between short term foreign borrowing of the private sector and yields on reserves, recognizing that reserves can correspond to a transfer between the private and the public sectors. By this measure, the cost can reach 1% of GDP to developing countries. While this is high, it should be viewed as an insurance against a crisis that could easily cost 10% of GDP to a country. In the context of theoretical economic models it is possible to simulate economies with different policies (accumulate reserves or not) and directly compare the welfare in terms of consumption. Results are mixed, since they depend on specific features of the models.

A case to point out is that of the Swiss National Bank, the central bank of Switzerland. The Swiss franc is regarded as a safe haven currency, so it usually appreciates during market's stress. In the aftermath of the 2008 crisis and during the initial stages of the Eurozone crisis, the Swiss franc (CHF) appreciated sharply. The central bank resisted appreciation by buying reserves. After accumulating reserves during 15 months until June 2010, the SNB let the currency appreciate. As a result, the loss with the devaluation of reserves just in 2010 amounted to CHF 27 Billion or 5% of GDP (part of this was compensated by the profit of almost CHF6 Billion due to the surge in the price of gold). In 2011, after the currency appreciated against the Euro from 1.5 to 1.1, the SNB announced a ceiling at the value of CHF 1.2. In the middle of 2012, reserves reached 71% of GDP.

== History ==
=== Origins and gold standard era ===
The modern exchange market as tied to the prices of gold began during 1880. Of this year the countries significant by size of reserves were Austria-Hungary, Belgium, Canadian Confederation, Denmark, Grand Duchy of Finland, German Empire and Sweden-Norway.

Official international reserves, the means of official international payments, formerly consisted only of gold, and occasionally silver. But under the Bretton Woods system, the US dollar functioned as a reserve currency, so it too became part of a nation's official international reserve assets. From 1944 to 1968, the US dollar was convertible into gold through the Federal Reserve System, but after 1968 only central banks could convert dollars into gold from official gold reserves, and after 1973 no individual or institution could convert US dollars into gold from official gold reserves. Since 1973, no major currencies have been convertible into gold from official gold reserves. Individuals and institutions must now buy gold in private markets, just like other commodities. Even though US dollars and other currencies are no longer convertible into gold from official gold reserves, they still can function as official international reserves.

Central banks throughout the world have sometimes cooperated in buying and selling official international reserves to attempt to influence exchange rates and avert financial crisis. For example, in the Baring crisis (the "Panic of 1890"), the Bank of England borrowed GBP 2 million from the Bank of France. The same was true for the Louvre Accord and the Plaza Accord in the post gold-standard era.

=== Post gold standard era ===
Historically, especially before the 1997 Asian financial crisis, central banks had rather meager reserves (by today's standards) and were therefore subject to the whims of the market, of which there was accusations of hot money manipulation, however Japan was the exception. In the case of Japan, forex reserves began their ascent a decade earlier, shortly after the Plaza Accord in 1985, and were primarily used as a tool to weaken the surging yen. This effectively granted the United States a massive loan as they were almost exclusively invested in US Treasuries, which assisted the US to engage the Soviet Union in an arms race which ended with the latter's bankruptcy, and at the same time, turned Japan into the world's largest creditor and the US the largest debtor, as well as swelled Japan's domestic debt (Japan sold its own currency to fund the buildup of dollar based assets). By end of 1980, foreign assets of Japan were about 13% of GDP but by the end of 1989 had reached an unprecedented 62%. After 1997, nations in East and Southeast Asia began their massive build-up of forex reserves, as their levels were deemed too low and susceptible to the whims of the market credit bubbles and busts. This build-up has major implications for today's developed world economy, by setting aside so much cash that was piled into US and European debt, investment had been crowded out, the developed world economy had effectively slowed to a crawl, giving birth to contemporary negative interest rates.

By 2007, the world had experienced yet another financial crisis, this time the US Federal Reserve organized central bank liquidity swaps with other institutions. Developed countries authorities adopted extra expansionary monetary and fiscal policies, which led to the appreciation of currencies of some emerging markets. The resistance to appreciation and the fear of lost competitiveness led to policies aiming to prevent inflows of capital and more accumulation of reserves. This pattern was called currency war by an exasperated Brazilian authority, and again in 2016 followed the commodities collapse, Mexico had warned China of triggering currency wars.

== Adequacy and excess reserves ==
The IMF proposed a new metric to assess reserves adequacy in 2011. The metric was based on the careful analysis of sources of outflow during crisis. Those liquidity needs are calculated taking in consideration the correlation between various components of the balance of payments and the probability of tail events. The higher the ratio of reserves to the developed metric, the lower is the risk of a crisis and the drop in consumption during a crisis. Besides that, the Fund does econometric analysis of several factors listed above and finds those reserves ratios are generally adequate among emerging markets.

Reserves that are above the adequacy ratio can be used in other government funds invested in more risky assets such as sovereign wealth funds or as insurance to time of crisis, such as stabilization funds. If those were included, Norway, Singapore and Persian Gulf States would rank higher on these lists, and United Arab Emirates' estimated $627 billion Abu Dhabi Investment Authority would be second after China. Apart from high foreign exchange reserves, Singapore also has significant government and sovereign wealth funds including Temasek Holdings (last valued at US$375 billion) and GIC (last valued at US$440 billion).

ECN is a unique electronic communication network that links different participants of the Forex market: banks, centralized exchanges, other brokers and companies and private investors.

== See also ==
- Balance of payments
- Endaka
- Foreign-exchange reserves of China
- Foreign-exchange reserves of India
- International Reserves of the Russian Federation
- Currency band
- Global assets under management
- List of countries by foreign exchange reserves
