= Guidotti–Greenspan rule =

Guideline in international finance

The Guidotti–Greenspan rule is an international economics guideline that states that a country's reserves should equal short-term external debt (one-year or less maturity), implying a ratio of reserves-to-short term debt of 1. The rationale is that countries should have enough reserves to resist a massive withdrawal of short term foreign capital.

In practice, few emerging markets adhered to this rule. The temptation to load up on short-term debt was powerful when doing so offered immediate savings on borrowing costs. In addition, Some countries rely on foreign markets or short-term debt because they lack the reputation necessary to borrow long term at home. Accumulating reserves required forgoing attractive consumption and investment opportunities. In addition, holding reserves was costly, since the yield on US Treasury bonds, the principal reserve asset, was lower than interest paid on the funds that governments borrowed.

The rule is named after Pablo Guidotti – Argentine former deputy minister of finance – and Alan Greenspan – former chairman of the Federal Reserve Board of the United States. Guidotti first stated the rule in a G-33 seminar in 1999, while Greenspan widely publicized it in a speech at the World Bank. In subsequent research Guzman Calafell and Padilla del Bosque found that the ratio of reserves to external debt is a relevant predictor of an external crisis.
