= Salvatore Guidotti =

Italian painter (1836–1889)

Salvatore Guidotti (1836 – after 1889) was an Italian painter.

== Biography ==
He was born in Naples. He began as a student of architecture, but then studied painting, only to join the military, and later law. He studied painting with Francesco Mancini (1830–1905). By 1869, he settled again to paint, and among his works are Orlando Furioso (exhibited at Florence); L'arrivo alla barriera, (exhibited at Rome); A Field of Goats and A Market (exhibited at the Promotrice of Naples); La caccia alle farfalle e Una rosa fra le spine (exhibited at the 1887 Exposition of Naples).
