= Reserve Tranche Position =

International Monetary Fund measurement

A country's Reserve Tranche Position (RTP) is the difference between the International Monetary Fund's (IMF) holdings of that country's currency and the country's IMF-designated quota.

== Background ==
The primary means of financing the International Monetary Fund (IMF) is through members' quotas. Each member of the IMF is assigned a quota (membership fee), part of which is payable in special drawing rights (SDRs) or specified usable currencies ("reserve assets"), and part in the member's own currency. The difference between a member's quota and the IMF's holdings of its currency is a country's Reserve Tranche Position (RTP). Reserve Tranche Position is accounted among a country's foreign-exchange reserves. Part of the quota can be withdrawn from the IMF without any interest during critical situations of a country such as Balance of Payment (BOP) crises. This part of the money which can be withdrawn without any interest is the RTP.

== See also ==
- Financial Transactions Plan
- Enhanced structural adjustment facility
