= Foreign-exchange reserves of China =

China's holdings of foreign debt and currencies

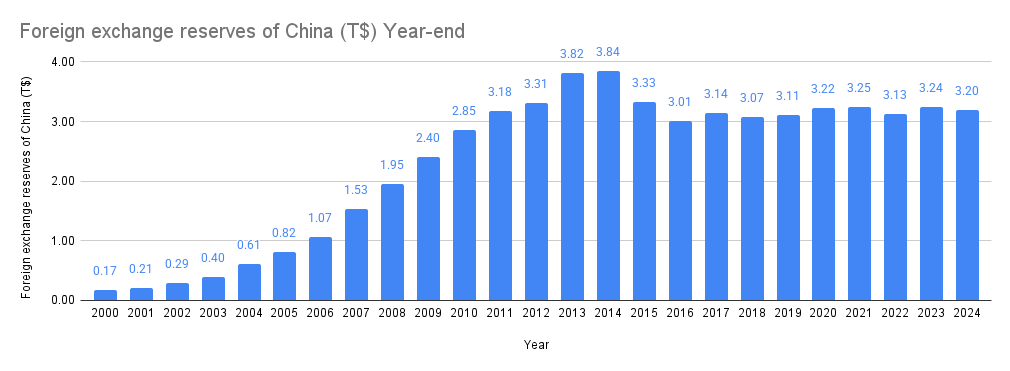
Foreign exchange reserves of China (T$) since 2000

The foreign exchange reserves of China are the state of foreign exchange reserves held by the People's Republic of China, comprising cash, bank deposits, bonds, and other financial assets denominated in currencies other than China's national currency (the renminbi). As of October 2026, China's foreign exchange reserves totaled US$3.405 trillion, which is the highest foreign exchange reserves of any country.

The management of foreign exchange reserves is governed by the State Administration of Foreign Exchange (SAFE) and the People's Bank of China.

== Size and composition ==
China's foreign exchange reserves are held by People's Bank of China, China's central bank. The total of the reserves is regularly announced by the central bank. In October 2026, China's reserves totalled US $3.405 trillion, which is the highest foreign exchange reserves of any country

The exact composition of China's foreign exchange reserves is classified information. In July 2019, China's State Administration of Foreign Exchange announced that at the end of 2014, US dollar assets accounted for 58% of China's total reserves, down from 79% in 1995; adding that its share of US currency assets was lower than the global average of 65% in 2014. Analysts believe the remaining foreign exchange assets are held mostly in Euros, Japanese Yen, and British pounds.

As of 2014, China had been the largest foreign holder of U.S. Treasury securities since 2008, when it overtook Japan in this respect, accounting for about 22% of all U.S. Treasuries held by non-Americans. However, as of 2024, China reduced its holdings of U.S. Treasury securities to $782 billion which made it the second largest foreign U.S. Treasury holder behind Japan.

In January 2023, China held $860 billion of US government debt, 11.6% of the total foreign holdings of US government debt. This ranks China as the second largest holder of US government debt, after Japan. China is gradually reducing its holding of US dollar reserve, down to 25% in 2023 from 59% of its total foreign-exchange in 2016. However, China also holds US bonds in custody accounts at Euroclear Bank (in Belgium) and Clearstream Banking SA (in Luxembourg) and it has a large portfolio of US Agencies (mortgage-backed securities, issued by government-sponsored enterprises). After adjusting for these, China's total US bond holdings declined by 5% between 2013 and 2023.

China's large foreign exchange reserves provide the state with capacity to influence financial markets without the necessity of administrative directives. The size of its reserves also have a symbolic function as a demonstration of China's growing economic strength and the political legitimacy of the Communist Party.

== History ==
At the conclusion of the Chinese Civil War, the defeated Nationalists stripped China of liquid assets including gold, silver, and the country's dollar reserves as they retreated to Taiwan. China did not have a meaningful amount of foreign reserves, nor a specialized foreign exchange reserve management system, until 1978.

Beginning in the early 1980s, China's foreign exchange reserves grew substantially.

China's approach to managing its foreign exchange reserves has been strongly influenced by the lessons Chinese policymakers learned from the 1997 Asian financial crisis and the 2008 financial crisis. During the Asian financial crisis, Chinese policymakers learned from the experiences of neighboring countries which suffered for their lack of foreign policy reserves (which had been further exacerbated in those countries by capital flight). China therefore tightened controls over foreign exchange and capital flows, including by making violations of these regulations punishable as criminal offenses.

From 2001 to 2006, China's foreign exchange reserves nearly quadrupled. In 2006, China became the world's largest holder of foreign exchange reserves. This rate convinced Chinese leadership that its foreign exchange reserves would continue to grow and help deter capital flight. After 2006, policymakers focused less on attracting foreign capital and instead to evaluate how reserves could advance China's interests domestically and internationally. For example, in December 2006 at a Standing Committee Meeting of the Tenth National People's Congress, Vice Premier Zeng Peiyan advocated for the use of foreign exchange reserves to support Chinese companies in obtaining foreign mineral resources, thereby developing China's access to strategic minerals.

The volatility of the 2008 financial crisis prompted Chinese policymakers, academics, and state-owned enterprise executives to begin evaluating whether China was overexposed to US treasury securities. Following the 2008 financial crisis, the Communist Party and the public sentiment generally agreed that investing so much of China's foreign exchange reserves in the US government's debt was untenable.

In the view of some Chinese historians, February 2009 comments by Premier Wen Jiabao to Financial Times mark a shift from China's passive approach to managing its foreign reserves to actively using its reserves to generate further profits and advance China's domestic economic development. Wen stated:

Foreign exchange reserves reflect the economic strength of a country. We are now studying how we can make the best use of foreign exchange reserves in China ... I think foreign exchange reserves are liabilities of the central bank, and if a government wants to make use of the foreign exchange reserves, it has to issue government bonds to buy the foreign exchange reserves. We are now having discussions about how to make rational and effective use of the Chinese foreign exchange reserves to serve the purpose of economic development in China ... Foreign exchange must be spent overseas, and it will be spent mainly on foreign trade and investment ... we want to use foreign exchange to buy the much-needed technology equipment and products.

Other advocates of this approach included governor of China Development Bank Chen Yuan, whose view was that China should hedge against increasing commodity prices and the falling US dollar by using China's foreign exchange reserves to buy energy and minerals. In 2009, there was broad support among Chinese economists for using foreign exchange reserves in this way.

China's foreign exchange reserves reached $3.1 trillion in April 2011. That same month, People's Bank of China governor Zhou Xiaochuan publicly stated that China's foreign reserves had become excessive and recommended that reserves be reduced by instead capitalizing sovereign funds.

Beginning in 2014, and as of at least 2023, China's relative share of global foreign exchange reserves has remained stable.

In 2015, China used foreign exchange reserves to recapitalize China Development Bank and the Export-Import Bank of China. This in turn empowered those policy banks to make significant loans in Eurasia, Latin America, Africa, and the Middle East.

== Concern over Chinese holdings of U.S. debt ==
After the 2008 financial crisis, Chinese policymakers and the general public viewed China's holdings of US debt as unwisely overexposing China to volatility.

Chinese economist and government advisor Yu Yongding views China's large holdings of US treasuries as a "grotesque misallocation of resources" given that their real net investment income to China has been negative for almost two decades. Yu also notes that the dollar is depreciating in real terms because of the US's rising national debt and the US Federal Reserve's expansionary monetary policy. Yu's view is that the US has already "stopped playing by the monetary rules." Accordingly, Yu favors moving China's foreign exchange reserves away from dollar-denominated assets and instead invest increasingly in raw energy and materials.

Many American and other economic analysts have expressed concern on account of China's "extensive" holdings of United States government debt as part of its reserves.

A significant number of economists and analysts dismiss any and all concern over foreign holdings of United States government debt denominated in U.S. dollars, including China's holdings.

China's holdings of US debt have been falling since early 2021 and as of 2022 were US$1 trillion and falling. As of March 2024, China's holdings of US debt was down to $767.4 billion.

== Evolution over time ==
Foreign-exchange reserves from 2004:

Year & month	Foreign-exchange reserves (US$ billion)
2004-01	415.7
2004-02	426.6
2004-03	439.8
2004-04	449
2004-05	458.6
2004-06	470.6
2004-07	483
2004-08	496.2
2004-09	514.5
2004-10	542.4
2004-11	573.9
2004-12	609.9
2005-01	623.6
2005-02	642.6
2005-03	659.1
2005-04	670.8
2005-05	691
2005-06	711
2005-09	769
2005-12	818.9
2006-01	845.2
2006-02	853.7
2006-03	875.1
2006-04	895
2006-05	925
2006-06	941.1
2006-07	954.6
2006-08	972
2006-09	987.9
2006-10	1009.6
2006-11	1038.8
2006-12	1066.3
2007-01	1104.7
2007-02	1157.4
2007-03	1202
2007-04	1246.6
2007-05	1292.7
2007-06	1332.6
2007-07	1385.2
2007-08	1408.6
2007-09	1433.6
2007-10	1454.9
2007-11	1497
2007-12	1528.2
2008-01	1589.8
2008-02	1647.1
2008-03	1682.2
2008-04	1756.7
2008-05	1797
2008-06	1808.8
2008-07	1845.2
2008-08	1884.2
2008-09	1905.6
2008-10	1879.7
2008-11	1884.7
2008-12	1946
2009-01	1913.5
2009-02	1912.1
2009-03	1952.7
2009-04	2008.9
2009-05	2089.5
2009-06	2131.6
2009-07	2174.6
2009-08	2210.8
2009-09	2272.6
2009-10	2328.3
2009-11	2388.8
2009-12	2399.2
2010-01	2415.2
2010-02	2424.6
2010-03	2447.1
2010-04	2490.5
2010-05	2439.5
2010-06	2454.3
2010-07	2538.9
2010-08	2547.8
2010-09	2648.3
2010-10	2760.9
2010-11	2767.8
2010-12	2847.3
2011-01	2931.7
2011-02	2991.4
2011-03	3044.7
2011-06	3197.5
2011-07	3245.3
2011-08	3262.5
2011-09	3201.7
2011-10	3273.8
2011-11	3220.9
2011-12	3181.1
2012-01	3253.6
2012-02	3309.7
2012-03	3305
2012-04	3298.9
2012-05	3206.1
2012-06	3240
2012-07	3240
2012-08	3272.9
2012-09	3285.1
2012-10	3287.4
2012-11	3297.7
2012-12	3311.6
2013-01	3410
2013-02	3395.4
2013-03	3442.6
2013-04	3534.5
2013-05	3514.8
2013-06	3496.7
2013-07	3547.8
2013-08	3553
2013-09	3662.7
2013-10	3736.6
2013-11	3789.5
2013-12	3821.3
2014-01	3866.6
2014-02	3913.7
2014-03	3948.1
2014-04	3978.8
2014-05	3983.9
2014-06	3993.2
2014-07	3966.3
2014-08	3968.8
2014-09	3887.7
2014-10	3852.9
2014-11	3847.4
2014-12	3843
2015-01	3813.41
2015-02	3801.5
2015-03	3730.04
2015-04	3748.14
2015-05	3711.14
2015-06	3693.84
2015-07	3651.31
2015-08	3557.38
2015-09	3514.12
2015-10	3525.51
2015-11	3438.28
2015-12	3330.36
...	...
2016-12	3010.52
...	...
2017-05	3053.57
2017-06	3056.79
2017-07	3080.72
2017-08	3091.53
2017-09	3108.51
2017-10	3109.21
2017-11	3119.28
2017-12	3139.95
2018-01	3161.46
2018-02	3134.48
2018-03	3142.82
...	...
2018-12	3072.71
...	...
2019-12	3107.92
...	...
2020-12	3216.52
...	...
2021-12	3250.17
...	...
2022-12	3127.69
...	...
2023-01	3184.46
2023-02	3133.15
2023-03	3183.87
2023-04	3204.77
2023-05	3176.51
2023-06	3193.00
2023-07	3204.27
2023-08	3160.10
2023-09	3115.07
2023-10	3101.22
2023-11	3171.81
2023-12	3237.98
2024-01	3219.32
2024-02	3225.82
2024-03	3245.66
2024-04	3200.83
2024-05	3232.04
2024-06	3222.36
2024-07	3256.37
2024-08	3288.22
2024-09	3316.37
2024-10	3261.05
2024-11	3265.86
2024-12	3202.36
2025-01	3209.04
2025-02	3227.22
2025-03	3240.66
2025-04	3281.66
2025-05	3285.26
2025-06	3317.42
2025-07	3292.24
2025-08	3322.15
2025-09	3338.66
2025-10	3343.34
2025-11	3346.37
2025-12	3357.87
2026-01	...
2026-02	3399.08
2026-03	3342.12
2026-04	...
2026-05	...
2026-06	...
2026-07	3418.78
2026-08	3438.32
2026-09	...
2026-10	3405.18

== See also ==
- Foreign exchange reserves
- Import substitution
- List of countries by foreign-exchange reserves
- List of countries by GDP (nominal)
