= Kohala Hydropower Project =

- Interactive map of Kohala Hydropower Project
- Official name: Kohala Hydropower Project
- Location: Azad Kashmir
- Coordinates: 34°05′57″N 73°29′47″E
- Status: Approved for construction
- Construction began: n
- Opening date: December 2025 (est.)
- Construction cost: $2.4 Billion
- Owner: China Three Gorges Corporation (CTG)

Dam and spillways
- Type of dam: Gravity, roller-compacted concrete
- Impounds: Jhelum River
- Height: 57 m (187 ft)
- Length: 212 m (696 ft)

Reservoir
- Total capacity: 49,000,000 m^{3} (39,725 acre⋅ft)
- Active capacity: 8,730,000 m^{3} (7,078 acre⋅ft)
- Surface area: .78 km^{2} (0 mi^{2})
- Maximum length: 6.4 km (4 mi)

Kohala Hydropower Project
- Coordinates: 34°04′13.6″N 73°30′01.9″E
- Type: Run-of-the-river
- Hydraulic head: 290 m (950 ft)
- Turbines: 4 x 281 MW Francis-type
- Installed capacity: 1124 MW
- Annual generation: 4800 GWh

The Kohala Hydropower Project is a proposed run-of-the-river, high head project of 316 meters that will be located near Kohala, in Azad Kashmir. In 2020 the project's agreement was finalised later it was formally signed in a ceremony attended by the Pakistani Prime Minister Imran khan, and Chinese ambassador.

== Location ==
The diversion dam site is on Jhelum River near Sarran Village 40 km upstream from Muzaffarabad and a 17.2 km long tunnel connects to the powerhouse which is located at Barsala 7 km upstream from Kohala Bridge.

== Background ==
China Three Gorges Corporation (CTGC), the state-owned hydropower developer, won the right to develop a hydroelectric dam in Pakistan on January 7, 2015. The Kohala Hydropower Project will be CTGC's largest investment in Pakistan.

In December 2018 the people of Muzaffarabad held protests against Kohala dam design due to its planned water diversion via tunnel which will bypass the Muzaffarabad city.

== Design ==
The dam's feasibility study and detailed engineering designs were performed by SMEC. The Kohala hydroelectric scheme will have a gravity, roller-concrete compacted dam on the upper branch of the Jhelum, 40 km from Muzaffarabad. The powerhouse, on the lower branch of the Jhelum near Barasala, will house four 281-MW Pelton turbines.

== Tariffs ==
CWE is required to construct the project on a build, own, operate and transfer basis. In 2014, local published reports said the average tariff for the first 12 years was set at 8.9 cents per unit and during the following 18 years would be 5.1 cents per unit. The average tariff for the 30-year life of the project is 7.9 cents per unit. The tariff ensures 17 per cent return on equity on internal rate of return basis.

== Carbon credit ==
The project is expected to earn carbon credit from the United Nations Framework Convention on Climate Change for clean energy development under the Kyoto protocol.

== See also ==
- List of dams and reservoirs in Pakistan
- List of power stations in Pakistan
- Azad Pattan Hydropower Project
- Duber Khwar hydropower project
- Gomal Zam Dam
- Gulpur Hydropower Project
- Karot Hydropower Project
- Khan Khwar Hydropower Project
- New Bong Escape Hydropower Project
- Patrind Hydropower Plant
- Satpara Dam
