= Lou Wenlong =

Chinese banker (born 1958)

- 楼文龙

Vice Governor of the Agricultural Bank of China
- In office December 2012 – 18 April 2017
- Governor: Zhang Yun; Zhao Huan

Personal details
- Born: January 1958 (age 68) Zhuji County, Zhejiang, China
- Party: Chinese Communist Party (expelled in 2024)
- Spouse: Wu Xiaomin
- Education: Zhejiang Financial College

Chinese name
- Simplified Chinese: 楼文龙
- Traditional Chinese: 樓文龍
Transcriptions
Standard Mandarin
- Hanyu Pinyin: Lóu Wénlóng

Lou Wenlong (Chinese: 楼文龙; born January 1958) is a retired Chinese banker who served as vice governor of the Agricultural Bank of China from 2012 to 2017. He was investigated by China's top anti-graft agency in April 2024.

== Biography ==
Lou was born in Zhuji County (now Zhuji), Zhejiang, in January 1958. After the high school, he studied, then taught, at what is now Zhejiang Financial College.

Thereafter, Lou successively worked in the Zhejiang Branch of the People's Bank of China and the Shanghai Branch of the People's Bank of China. In November 1998, the People's Bank of China implemented a management system reform, abolished provincial-level branches, and established nine branches across provinces (autonomous regions or municipalities), namely regional branches. The Shanghai branch of the People's Bank of China (now the Shanghai Headquarters of the People's Bank of China) was the first to establish a regional branch, and at the same time, financial supervision offices in both cities of Hangzhou and Fuzhou was established to supervise financial institutions within its jurisdiction. Lou was transferred to the position of director and assistant commissioner of the Bank Inspection Department of the Hangzhou Financial Supervision Office. In 2002, he was transferred again to Beijing and appointed as deputy leader of the Construction Bank Supervision Group under the First Division of Bank of China. He was promoted to director of the No.2 Banking Supervision Department of the China Banking Regulatory Commission. He was director of the Beijing Supervision Bureau of the China Banking Regulatory Commission in February 2009, in addition to serving as party secretary. In August 2012, he became a member of the senior management team of Agricultural Bank of China was elevated to vice governor in the following month. He resigned on 18 April 2017. In October 2019, he took office as president of Zhejiang Entan Industrial and Financial Research Institute.

== Family ==
Lou married his alumni Wu Xiaomin (吴晓敏), who previously served as general manager of the Investment Banking Department of Guosen Securities.

== Investigation ==
On 16 May 2024, Lou was suspected of "serious violations of laws and regulations" by the Central Commission for Discipline Inspection (CCDI), the party's internal disciplinary body, and the National Supervisory Commission, the highest anti-corruption agency of China. Lou's alumni at Zhejiang Financial College, including Wang Yaoting (王耀庭), former vice governor of Huaxia Bank, Li Jun (刘军), former governor of Chengdu Rural Commercial Bank, He Xingxiang, vice governor of the China Development Bank, and Ni Xianmeng (倪贤孟), vice governor of the Zhejiang Branch of China Development Bank, were sacked for graft. And his superiors and colleagues, such as Cai Esheng (Assistant to the Governor of the People's Bank of China), Tang Shuangning (director of the No.1 Supervision Department), Cai Jiangting (director of the No.2 Supervision Department of the No.2 Banking Supervision Department), and Lai Xiaomin, were also sacked for graft. On November 20, he was expelled from the CCP. On December 12, he was arrested by the Supreme People's Procuratorate.

On 15 March 2025, Lou was indicted on suspicion of accepting bribes. On August 25, he was sentenced to life imprisonment for taking bribes worth more than 84.51 million yuan ($11.81 million) by the Quanzhou Intermediate People's Court in Fujian province. He was deprived of his political rights for life, and all his personal assets were confiscated.
