= Sovereign funds of China =

Public financing mechanism

Sovereign funds of China are mechanisms through which the Chinese state acts as a market participant with the goals of supporting key domestic economic sectors, advancing strategic interests internationally, and diversifying its foreign exchange reserves.

== Significance ==
Typically, sovereign wealth funds are mostly commodity based. They have often been established by commodity-exporting states, especially those which are rich in oil resources. These typical sovereign wealth funds are capitalized by the sovereign's national resources and help stabilize national budgets by weathering commodity price fluctuations.

In contrast, China funds its sovereign funds through the state leveraging its financial and political resources. This includes capitalizing a fund through the issuance of new debt such as government bonds. Researcher Zongyuan Zoe Liu (while working at the US Council on Foreign Relations) coined the term "sovereign leveraged funds" to distinguish China's sovereign funds from the more typical commodity-based sovereign funds. She wrote: "A distinctive feature of SLFs is their funding scheme, which relies upon a series of complicated financial transactions, including debt issuances and other forms of financial leverage." Although China's sovereign funds are structured in the manner of private entities, they are state funded and their managers are appointed by the Chinese Communist Party (CCP).

China's sovereign funds also use state assets like foreign exchange reserves which are converted to riskier but potentially more profitable capital in the hands of the fund.

China's sovereign funds have contributed capital to policy-oriented state financing institutions including the China Development Bank, the Silk Road Fund, and the Export–Import Bank of China. In turn, these policy financing institutions have played a major role in supporting the Belt and Road Initiative (BRI). Of China's sovereign funds, only the Silk Road Fund was capitalized with an explicit geo-economic mission (in the Silk Road Fund's case, supporting the BRI).

China's sovereign funds are part of China's "national team" of institutional investors that can buy depressed assets to add liquidity to the market and improve its stability.

China's sovereign funds also help finance state procurement of assets overseas, support Chinese enterprise in engaging in mergers and acquisitions abroad, and support Chinese tech start-ups. Sovereign funds are among the mechanisms through which the Chinese state seeks to capitalize on industrial development.

As Liu summarizes, these funds "reduce the state's reliance on non-market measures, when engaging with the market. These funds can use equity participation to become direct participants in the market, and provide capital to companies in the industries prioritized by the state." China's sovereign funds have developed to become important instruments of Chinese financial statecraft.

In the Introduction to her book "Sovereign funds: How the Communist Party of China finances its global ambitions", Liu wrote:

By using China’s state-owned capital to fill the cash coffers of Western firms while advancing national interests, China’s sovereign funds could quietly use the US-led global economic system to put an end to American hegemony. If US policymakers fail to understand the political-economic model of China’s sovereign funds and how they advance the global ambitions of the Communist Party of China (CPC), then the United States risks surrendering its leadership in financial markets earlier than anticipated and in unexpected parts of the world.

== History ==
China's development of its sovereign funds was influenced by the 1997 Asian financial crisis and the 2008 financial crisis. According to researcher Zongyuan Zoe Liu, "The CPC leadership responded to these shocks by reexamining the boundaries of state-market relations in China and reinterpreting the Party's commitment to reform and opening up." This included reinterpreting China's approach to managing its foreign currency reserves and other state-owned assets more generally.

China's first sovereign fund was Central Huijin, which it established in 2003.

China's sovereign wealth funds entered global markets in 2007, with the establishment of China Investment Corporation (CIC). Since then, the scale and scope of China's sovereign funds have expanded significantly. As of 2019, China's funds collectively managed in excess of US$2 trillion assets, and as of early 2022, 31% of all assets held by sovereign funds were held by Chinese sovereign funds. China's four largest sovereign funds are each among the ten largest sovereign funds worldwide.

CIC's task was to invest in foreign markets, seeking investments that were higher risk and higher reward than government bonds. Its entry into global markets shortly before the 2008 financial crisis meant that its early performance was lackluster.

In 2009, expansion of China's sovereign funds was supported by two primary factors. After the 2008 financial crisis, a domestic political consensus developed for China to more aggressively invest its foreign exchange reserves. Simultaneously, foreign states sought to benefit from an influx of Chinese capital. These conditions were favorable for the development of China's sovereign funds and CIC, the China-Africa Development Fund, and several State Administration of Foreign Exchange-affiliated funds were further developed at that time.

The lackluster performance of CIC created a political opening in 2013 for the State Administration of Foreign Exchange to expand the sovereign funds under its jurisdiction.

In 2013, CCP general secretary Xi Jinping called for the creation of state-owned investment companies to invest in key industries such as civil aviation, energy, mineral resources, nuclear power, and logistics. Finance Minister Lou Jiwei, who had prior sovereign fund experience as the chair of CIC and its former CEO, was tasked with developing this proposal and served as lead author for the State Council's "Opinions on Reforming and Improving the State-Owned Assets Management System."

In November 2022, China's sovereign fund China Investment Corporation called for the promotion of globalization and the “free, open and orderly” flow of international investment to support “steady recovery and sustainable development of the world economy.”

== Specific funds ==
China's sovereign funds include two primary funds, the China Investment Corporation (CIC) and the State Administration of Foreign Exchange (SAFE), as well as numerous other funds.

=== Central Huijin ===
China's first sovereign fund, Central Huijin's creation in 2003 was inspired by what Chinese policymakers learned during the 1997 Asian financial crisis. It was initially created as special purpose vehicle for recapitalizing Chinese banks. Central Huijin is now the largest shareholder of the vast majority of Chinese financial institutions. As of 2019, it owned the second-largest share of China Development Bank.

=== China Investment Corporation ===
In 2007, CIC was established. CIC was established through the use of explicit leverage. To capitalize CIC, the Ministry of Finance issued bonds, used the bond issuance proceeds to buy foreign exchange reserves from the People's Bank of China, and in turn funded CIC with the purchased reserves. CIC was then tasked with investing in foreign markets that were both higher risk and higher reward than investing in government bonds.

=== State Administration of Foreign Exchange ===
SAFE is the administrative unit which handles foreign exchange management for the People's Bank of China. It oversees a number of sovereign funds that invest part of China's foreign exchange reserves in investment vehicles including infrastructure projects, real estate, private equity, and strategic resources.

=== Funds within SASAC ===
As of June 2022, there are 19 state-owned capital investment companies under SASAC. These were restructured from previously existing state-owned enterprises within SASAC's jurisdiction.

== See also ==
- China Government Guidance Fund
- Economic history of China (1949–present)
- Policy banks
