= He Xingxiang =

Chinese economist and former vice-governor of China Development Bank

- 何兴祥

Vice Governor of China Development Bank
- In office October 2014 – September 2021
- Governor: Ouyang Weimin

Personal details
- Born: November 1963 (age 62) Shaoxing, Zhejiang, China
- Party: Chinese Communist Party
- Education: Zhejiang Financial College

Chinese name
- Simplified Chinese: 何兴祥
- Traditional Chinese: 何興祥
Transcriptions
Standard Mandarin
- Hanyu Pinyin: Hé Xīngxiáng

He Xingxiang (Chinese: 何兴祥; born November 1963) is a former Chinese banker who served as vice governor of China Development Bank from 2014 to 2021. As of September 2021 he was under investigation for bribery.

== Biography ==
He was born in Shaoxing, Zhejiang, in 1963, and graduated from Zhejiang Bank School (now Zhejiang Financial College). He once served as governor of the Bank of China, Shangyu Branch and then the Bank of China, Jiaxing Branch in east China's Zhejiang province. In September 2004 he was promoted to become governor of the Bank of China, Hainan Branch, a position he held until April 2008, when he was transferred to north China's Shandong province as governor of the Bank of China, Shandong Branch. In October 2014 he was promoted again to become vice governor of the Agricultural Development Bank of China, and served until April 2020, while he was dispatched to China Development Bank as vice governor.

=== Downfall ===
On 10 September 2021, he has been placed under investigation for "serious violations of laws and regulations" by the Central Commission for Discipline Inspection (CCDI), the party's internal disciplinary body, and the National Supervisory Commission, the highest anti-corruption agency of China. Hu Huaibang, former chairman of the China Development Bank, was placed under investigation for alleged "serious violations of discipline and law" in July 2019.

On 26 January 2024, he was sentenced to 20 years in prison for committing the crimes of taking bribes, issuing financial bills in disregard of regulations, granting loans illegally and concealing overseas deposits. Prosecutors accused He of taking advantage of his different positions between 2006 and 2021 and to used his influence and authority to assist relevant entities and individuals with bank credit and employment for their children, illegally receiving money and valuables totaling over 66.36 million yuan in return. He was also issued a fine of 5.1 million yuan (about 717,560 U.S. dollars).
