= China–Africa Development Fund =

Chinese sovereign fund

China-Africa Development Fund
- Type: China Government Guidance Fund
- Founded: June 26, 2007; 19 years ago
- Headquarters: Beijing, China
- Area served: China, Africa
- Key people: Zhao Jianping (Chairman); Chi Jianxin (President)
- Parent: China Development Bank
- Website: www.cadfund.com

The China–Africa Development Fund (CAD Fund; Chinese: 中非发展基金) is a China Government Guidance Fund funded by China Development Bank. It invests in African projects across power generation, transportation infrastructure, natural resources, and manufacturing.

== History ==
The fund was announced by General Secretary Hu Jintao at the November 2006 Beijing summit of the Forum on China-Africa Cooperation as one of the "Eight Measures" for Sino-African relations. It launched in June 2007 with US$1 billion from China Development Bank. A second fundraising round began in May 2010 targeting US$2 billion, and in 2015 China announced plans to expand the fund to US$10 billion.

== Investment approach ==
The fund selects projects based on commercial merit rather than by country, targeting sectors critical to African development such as agriculture, manufacturing, and infrastructure. Primary recipients are Chinese enterprises operating in Africa. The Chinese government exempts the fund from corporate income tax on African investment earnings.

The fund also supports Chinese special economic zones in Africa through grants, loans, and subsidies, though the Chinese government generally leaves zone development to enterprises working directly with host countries.

== Investments ==
- (South Africa) Jidong Cement plant (2010): Contributed 382.5 million ZAR toward a 1.65 billion ZAR Jidong Cement plant in Limpopo.
- (Namibia) Husab Mine (2012): Formed a joint venture with China National Nuclear Corporation to acquire the uranium mine for US$996 million.
- (South Africa) Independent News and Media SA (2013): Acquired 20% stake for 400 million ZAR.
- (Ethiopia) Leather factory (2009): Joint venture with Xinxiang Kuroda Mingliang Leather Co. investing ~US$27 million near Addis Ababa; also helped establish the Ethiopian Eastern Industrial Zone.
- Asogli power plant: Ghana's first privately owned power plant, located in Tema.
- (Ghana) Africa World Airlines: Equity stake in the Ghanaian carrier.
- (Kenya) Hydro-power and infrastructure: Over US$16 million in investments and support for the LAPSSET corridor project.
- (Liberia) Bong County iron ore mine: Acquired 85% stake from China-Union Mining in 2007; sold 60% to WISCO International in 2010.
- (Zambia) Cotton and copper: Cotton cultivation and copper mining projects.
- (China) Huayou Cobalt (SSE: 603799): 7.59% stake.

== See also ==
- Africa–China relations
- China-Africa Economic and Trade Expo
