= EIG Global Energy Partners =

American energy investment firm

EIG Global Energy Partners LLC
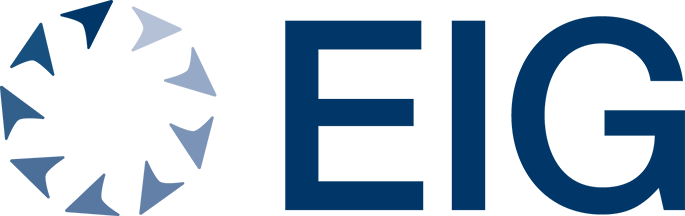
- Formerly: TCW Energy & Infrastructure Group
- Type: Private
- Industry: Investment management
- Founded: 1982; 44 years ago
- Headquarters: Washington, D.C., U.S.
- Key people: Robert Blair Thomas (Chairman and CEO); Randall Wade (President)
- Products: Private credit Private equity Mezzanine capital Infrastructure fund
- AUM: US$29.1 billion (September 2026)
- Number of employees: 134 (March 2023)
- Website: eigpartners.com

EIG Global Energy Partners (also known as EIG and EIG Partners) is an American investment firm headquartered in Washington, D.C. It focuses on investments in the energy sector. The firm has additional offices in Hong Kong, Houston, London, Rio de Janeiro, Seoul and Sydney.

In 2023, the firm was ranked by Infrastructure Investor (under Private Equity International) as the fifth largest infrastructure debt investment firm based on total fundraising over the most recent five-year period.

== Background ==
In 1982, the TCW Group (TCW) established its Energy & Infrastructure Group in Los Angeles. The purpose of it was to invest solely in companies or projects in energy-related infrastructure. This was by providing mezzanine debt and private equity to energy projects and companies mainly in OCED countries. It would also target one-off negotiated private transactions with small- and mid-cap energy companies.

In 2007, the Energy & Infrastructure Group founded TCW Energy Partners, a feeder fund that invests in EIG-managed funds and projects and only accepts investments from institutional investors. It was listed on GSTrUE, a private exchange managed by Goldman Sachs. Barry Cheung was a director of the fund.

In January 2011, TCW Energy & Infrastructure Group was spun off as an independent firm and was renamed to EIG Global Energy Partners. The stated reasons for the split was the energy team wanted to "own the upside" of their business and free themselves from regulatory red tape. EIG moved its headquarters from Los Angeles to Washington, D.C.

In June 2011, TCW Energy Partners was renamed to Gateway Energy & Resource (Gateway).

In February 2012, China Investment Corporation acquired an undisclosed minority stake in EIG.

In March 2012, EIG planned to list Gateway on the Hong Kong Stock Exchange to raise US$200 million and allow a larger range of investors to get exposure to EIG's investments. However it withdrew due to poor market conditions. In September 2012, another attempt to list was done In December 2012, China Development Bank and Gateway signed a letter of intent where Gateway would be acquired by the listing platform, China Development Bank International Investment which would allow Gateway to list on the Hong Kong Stock Exchange via backdoor listing. However, on August 7, 2013, the deal was terminated.

In March 2014, Affiliated Managers Group acquired an undisclosed minority stake in EIG.

== Notable deals ==
In April 2021, a consortium led by EIG signed a deal to acquire a 49% equity stake in the oil pipelines business of Saudi Aramco for $12.4 billion.

In March 2023, EIG and Brookfield Corporation acquired Origin Energy for $10.2 billion. Origin Energy would be broken up with EIG taking the liquefied natural gas unit. In October 2023, the takeover was approved by the Australian Competition & Consumer Commission. The acquisition was terminated in December 2023 after Origin shareholders led by its largest investor, AustralianSuper, opposed the deal, failing to meet the required 75% threshold.

== Legal actions ==
=== The Carlyle Group acquisition of TCW ===
In August 2012, EIG filed a lawsuit to prevent a deal where The Carlyle Group would acquire its former parent, TCW. EIG alleged the deal violated certain contractual rights granted to EIG as part of its separation from TCW. It resolved around a joint venture between EIG and TCW that was put in place at the time of the spin off to act as a central clearing house for sharing some of the economics of EIG's funds with TCW. The deal would put EIG's proprietary information into the hands of Carlyle which EIG deemed a direct competitor. However sources stated the EIG's real purpose behind the lawsuit was to sever all ties with TCW by using the company's ability to block the acquisition as leverage.

In January 2013, EIG came to an agreement with the parties and dropped its lawsuit opposing the deal. As part of the agreement, EIG would no longer make payments to TCW on new funds it introduces in the future, As a result, Carlyle acquired TCW from Société Générale in February 2013.

=== Intervention Energy Holdings ===
Intervention Energy Holdings (Intervention) had received $200 million in senior secured notes from EIG in 2012, which it used to finance well development costs. However, in the fall of 2015, Intervention defaulted on its debt and at the time still owed EIG $140 million.

On May 20, 2016, Intervention Energy Holdings filed for Chapter 11 bankruptcy and EIG filed a lawsuit to stop the process stating that according an agreement, Intervention could not file for bankruptcy protection without 100% of shareholder votes. As EIG did not vote to support it, Intervention was in breach of contract.

However, on June 6, 2016, the court sided with Intervention and denied EIG's bid to stop the process. Intervention at the time agreed to a deadline to receive a new loan or equity commitment to pay back EIG by November 15.

In late October 2016, EIG made another attempt to stop the process stating that Intervention was fast approaching the deadline and it had provided no indication that it would be able to obtain such financing.

In late November 2016, the court dismissed Intervention's Chapter 11 Case. As a result, EIG took control of Intervention.

== Relationship with Aubrey McClendon and Chesapeake Energy ==
It was reported that EIG was the lender of over $1.2 billion worth of personal loans to Aubrey McClendon who ran Chesapeake Energy (Chesapeake) until 2013. These loans were used to finance his personal stake in the oil wells of Chesapeake as well as drilling costs. When this revelation became public, McClendon was forced to leave the company. This raised the potential for conflicts of interest and prompted questions on the corporate governance and business ethics of Chesapeake's senior management. However EIG was not accused of impropriety.

EIG had known McClendon and Chesapeake since its establishment and had provided early stage financing which enabled Chesapeake to hold an initial public offering in 1993. The strong relationship created unique business opportunities that EIG benefited from. When Tom L. Ward left Chesapeake in 2006 to found SandRidge Energy, EIG invested $50 million in the company, which returned over twice the initial investment when the company held its initial public offering in November 2007. EIG also invested in Permian Resources which was another one of McClendon's companies. Before McClendon's death on March 2, 2016, due to a car crash, EIG had already taken possession of his stakes in the oil wells by foreclosing on the loans.
