= State visit by Xi Jinping to Pakistan =

2015 Chinese state visit to Pakistan

- Date: 20–21 April 2015
- Venue: Islamabad; Murree
- Cause: China–Pakistan Economic Corridor
- Organised by: Government of Pakistan

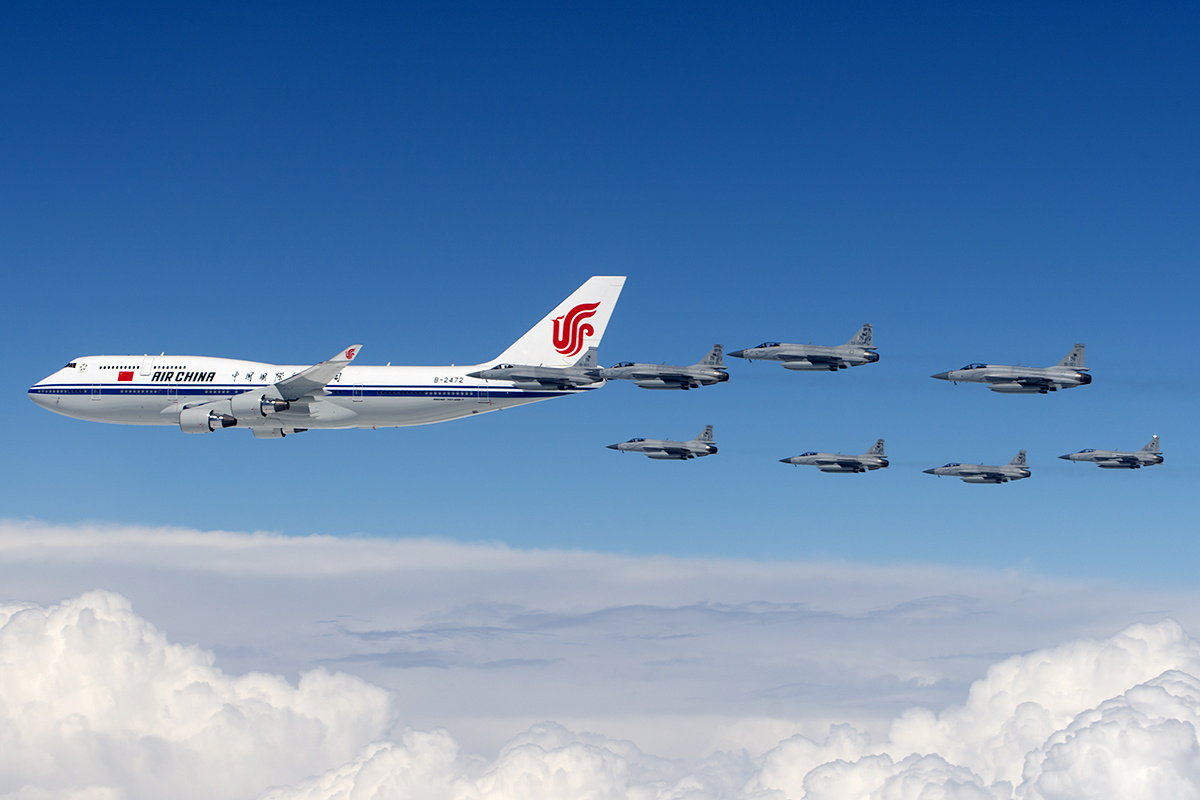
Eight JF-17 aircraft of the Pakistan Air Force welcoming and escorting Xi Jinping on his arrival in Pakistan's airspace.

Xi Jinping's visit to Pakistan from 20 to 21 April 2015, was the first state visit of CCP General Secretary Xi Jinping to Pakistan. Xi is the second Chinese leader to visit Pakistan in the 2010s after Chinese Premier Li Keqiang's visit to Pakistan between 22 and 23 May 2013. It was also Xi's first overseas trip of 2015. The trip led to the signing of accords for $46 billion of investment in Pakistan by China for the construction of roads, rails, and power plants to be built on a commercial basis by Chinese companies over 15 years. Most of the 51 projects were part of the China–Pakistan Economic Corridor.

The trip also showed the confirmation of the sale of eight Chinese submarines, more than doubling Pakistan's fleet. The trip was tremendously covered by international media. The New York Times claimed it to be a "gesture likely to confirm the decline of American influence in that nation". According to the BBC, the Chinese state and its banks would lend to Chinese companies to carry out the work, thereby making it a commercial venture with direct impact on China's slackening economy.

In this state visit, Pakistan conferred its highest civilian award Nishan-e-Pakistan on Xi Jinping for his "outstanding contribution in promotion of relationship between the two countries." This was the fourth time that Pakistan awarded Chinese Premier or CCP General Secretary this award, earlier Li Peng (1999), Hu Jintao (2006), Li Keqiang (2013) were awarded.

== Background ==
Xi was to visit Pakistan in 2014 during his South Asia trip to India, Sri Lanka, and the Maldives but postponed it due to political unrest. In February 2015, some reports of Xi Jinping's trip to Pakistan to attend the Pakistan Day Parade came in the backdrop of US President Barack Obama's second visit to India to attend the Delhi Republic Day parade. Pakistan also set to hold Pakistan Day parade after gap of 7 years since 2008. However, in March 2015, National Security Advisor of Pakistan Sartaj Aziz cleared that Xi Jinping may not visit Pakistan day parade but confirmed that he would be making his first state visit to Pakistan within the 'next few months.' Chinese Foreign Minister Wang Yi also confirmed that Xi Jinping would be making his first state visit to Pakistan soon.

== Agreements ==
The Silk Road Fund's first investment project was announced during the visit. Its management arm (The Silk Road Fund Company) signed a memorandum of understanding with the China Three Gorges Corporation and Pakistan Private Power and Infrastructure Board to build the Karot Hydropower Station in Pakistan. The project was a priority within the China-Pakistan Economic Corridor of the Belt and Road Initiative. It is operated by China for thirty years with an agreement to transfer ownership to Pakistan's government thereafter.

Other agreements signed between Pakistan and China during the visit were:

- Economic and technical cooperation agreement between China and Pakistan.
- Exchange of Notes of feasibility study of the Demonstration Project of the DTMB.
- Exchange of notes on provision of Anti-Narcotics Equipment.
- Exchange of notes on provision of Law Enforcement Equipment.
- Exchange of Notes on Feasibility Study of Gwadar Hospital.
- MoU on provision of Chinese governmental concessional Loan for second phase up-gradation of Karakorum Highway (Havelian to Thakot) between Ministry of Commerce of China and Ministry of Finance and Economic Affairs of Pakistan.
- MoU on provision of Chinese governmental concessional Loan for Karachi-Lahore Motorway (Multan to Sukkur) between Ministry of Commerce of China and Ministry of Finance and Economic Affairs of Pakistan.
- MoU on provision of Chinese governmental concessional Loan for Gwadar port East Bay Expressway Project between Ministry of Commerce of China and Ministry of Finance and Economic Affairs of Pakistan.
- MoU on provision of Chinese governmental concessional Loan for Gwadar International Airport between Ministry of Commerce of China and Ministry of Finance and Economic Affairs of Pakistan.
- Protocol on Banking Services to Agreement on Trade in Services.
- MoU on provision of Material for Tackling Climate Change between National Development and Reform Commission of China and Ministry of Finance of Pakistan.
- Framework Agreement on Cooperation on Major Communications Infrastructure Project.
- MoU on Cooperation between NDRC of China and Ministry of Planning Development and Reform of Pakistan.
- MoU on Pro-Bono Projects in the Port of Gwadar Region between Ministry for Planning, Development and Reform of Pakistan and the International Department of the Central Committee of the Chinese Communist Party.
- MoU on establishment of China-Pakistan Joint Cotton Bio-Tech Laboratory between the Ministry of Science and Technology of China and the Ministry of Science and Technology of Pakistan.
- Framework Agreement between the National Railway Administration, China and the Ministry of Railways, Pakistan on Joint Feasibility Study for up-gradation of ML1 and Establishment of Havelain Dry port of Pakistan Railways.
- Protocol on the Establishment of China-Pakistan Joint Marine Research Center between State Oceanic Administration of China and the Ministry of Science and Technology of Pakistan.
- MoU on cooperation between the State Administration of Press, Publication, Radio, Films and Television of China and Ministry of Information, Broadcasting and National Heritage of Pakistan.
- Triple Party Agreement between China Central Television and PTV and Pakistan Television Foundation on the re-broadcasting of CCTV-NEWS/CCTV -9 Documentary in Pakistan.
- Protocol on establishment of Sister Cities Relationship between Chengdu city Sichuan Province of PRC and Lahore City.
- Protocol on establishment of Sister Cities Relationship between Zhuhai City, Guangdong province of the People's Republic of China and Gwadar city, Balochistan of Pakistan.
- Protocol on establishment of Sister Cities Relationship between Karamay City, XianjianUgur, autonomous region of China and Gwadar city, Balochistan of Pakistan.
- Framework Agreement between NEA and MoPNRon Gwadar-Nawabshah LNG Terminal and Pipeline Project.
- Commercial Contract on Orange Line.
- Agreement on financing for Lahore Orange line Metro Train project.
- MoU on financing for KKH up-gradation Phase-2 (Havelian to Takot), KLM, Gwadar East Bay Expressway, Gwadar International Airport Projects.
- Financing Agreement relating to the 870 MW Hydro-Electric Suki Kinari Hydropower Project between EXIM Bank of China, Industrial and Commercial Bank of China Limited and SK Hydro (Private) Limited.
- Financing Cooperation Agreement between the EXIM Bank of China and Port Qasim Electric Power Company (Private) Limited (on Port Qasim 2×660 MW Coal-fired Power Plant).
- Term sheet of the facility for Zonergy 9×100 MW solar project in Punjab between China Development Bank Corporation, EXIM Bank of China and Zonergy Company limited.
- Drawdown Agreement on Jhimpir wind Power project between UEP Wind power (Private) Limited as Borrower and China Development Bank Corporation as lender.
- Terms and Conditions in favor of Sindh Engro Coal Mining Company for Thar Block II 3.8Mt/a mining Project, Sindh province, Pakistan Arranged by China Development Bank Corporation.
- Terms and Conditions in favor of Engro Powergen Thar (Private) Limited, Sindh province, Pakistan for Thar Block II 2×330 MW Coal Fired Power Project Arranged by China Development Bank Corporation.
- Framework Agreement of Financing Cooperation in Implementing the China-Pakistan Economic Corridor between China Development Corporation and HBL.
- MoU with respect to Cooperation between WAPDA and CTG.
- MoU among PPIB, CTG, and Silk Road Fund on Development of Private Hydro Power Projects.
- Facility operating Agreement for Dawood Wind Power project between ICBC and PCC of China and HDPPL.
- Framework Agreement for Promoting Chinese Investments and industrial Parks Developments in Pakistan between ICBC and HBL on financial services corporation.
- The financing term sheet agreement for Thar Block–I between ICBC, SSRL.
- Energy Strategic Cooperation Framework Agreement between Punjab Province of Pakistan and China Huaneng Group.
- Framework Agreement on the China Pakistan Economic Corridor Energy Project Cooperation between Ministry of Water & Power and China Export & Credit Insurance Corporation (SINOSURE).
- Cooperation Agreement between Sino-Sindh Resources (Pvt.) Ltd and Shanghai Electric Group for Thar coalfield Block I Coal-Power integrated Project in Pakistan.
- Cooperation Agreement for Matiyari-Lahore and Matyari (Port Qasim)-Faisalabad Transmission and Transformation Project between National Transmission Distribution Company (NTDC) and National Grid of China.
- IA on Port Qasim Coal fired Power Plant between Power China and GoP.
- Facility Agreement for the Sahiwal Coal-fired Power Plant Project between industrial and Commercial Bank of China Limited, Huaneng Shandong Electricity limited and Shandong Ruyi.
- Cooperation Agreement on Hubco Coal-fired Power Plant.

== Impact ==
After the visit, China's funding of China-Pakistan Economic Corridor projects increased, reaching more than USD 60 billion by 2017.
