= Bai Chong'en =

Chinese economist

Bai Chong'en (Chinese: 白重恩) is a noted Chinese economist. He holds the Mansfield Freeman Chair in Economics at Tsinghua University. He studied at the University of Science and Technology of China (bachelor's in math, 1983), University of California, San Diego (PhD in math, 1988), and Harvard University (PhD in economics, 1993). His research interests are wide and he has published many well-cited papers in a wide range of subjects including those dealing with corporate governance, development economics, industrial and organisational economics, the role of incentives and public economics - often with a focus on China. Bai is an Independent Director of the Board of Directors of China Investment Corporation.

== Selected publications ==
Bai, C. E., Liu, Q., Lu, J., Song, F. M., & Zhang, J. (2004). Corporate governance and market valuation in China. Journal of Comparative Economics, 32(4), 599–616.

Bai, C. E., Hsieh, C. T., & Qian, Y. (2006). The return to capital in China (No. w12755). National Bureau of Economic Research.
