= SSBT OD05 Omnibus =

SSBT OD05 OMNIBUS ACCOUNT—TREATY CLIENTS and SSBT OD05 OMNIBUS CHINA TREATY 808150 are mysterious investment funds holding significant stakes in more than 170 large Japanese publicly traded companies. Although their stake in a single company never exceeds 5% (a level that requires greater disclosure under Japanese securities laws), the total value of their stakes is exceeding ¥ 3.58 trillion (app. $ 45 billion) as of 2012. Funds are registered in Australia, but investors are not known. It is widely believed that investors are China’s state-owned China Investment Corporation and State Administration of Foreign Exchange.
