= China Development Bank International Investment =

Strategic state-owned bank

- Formerly: New Capital International Investment
- Traded as: SEHK: 1062
- ISIN: KYG2125D1007
- Industry: Financial services
- Predecessor: ING Beijing Investment
Founded
9 February 1993; 33 years ago	(ING Beijing)
1 August 2003; 22 years ago	(New Capital)
2005	(merger)
Headquarters
Room 4506-4509, 2 IFC, Hong Kong S.A.R., China	(de facto)
Grand Cayman, Cayman Islands	(registered office)
Key people
Bai Zhe	(chairman)
- Services: merchant banking
- Net income: ▼HK$90 million (2016)
- Total assets: ▲HK$1.315 billion (2016)
- Total equity: ▲HK$1.307 billion (2016)
Owner
China Development Bank	(66.16%)
Lui Tong	(5.64%)
other shareholders	(28.20%)
- Parent: China Development Bank
- Website: cdb-intl.com
- Footnotes / references in a consolidated financial statement

China Development Bank International Investment
- Simplified Chinese: 国开国际投资
- Traditional Chinese: 國開國際投資
Transcriptions

China Development Bank International
- Simplified Chinese: 国开国际
- Traditional Chinese: 國開國際
Transcriptions

China Development Bank International Investment Limited is a Cayman Islands-incorporated investment company headquartered in Hong Kong. It was listed company on the Hong Kong stock exchange since 1994 (as ING Beijing Investment, formerly "Honlinda Limited"), and is a red chip company.

== History ==
The bank was listed as a red chip company on 10 May 1994. The listed company was known as "New Capital International Investment" from 2003 to 2012. New Capital International Investment took-over ING Beijing Investment, by-then a listed company that incorporated in Hong Kong in 2005. ING Beijing was dissolved in 2007. New Capital International Investment replaced the Hong Kong incorporated company as the new holding company of the group as well as the listing status. It was renamed to the current name after a takeover by the state-owned China Development Bank.

China Development Bank International Investment was planned to form a joint venture with EIG Global Energy Partners in 2015.

== Shareholders ==
In 2002, the largest shareholder of ING Beijing Investment was ING Group for 15.78% shares (85,140,000 number of shares). After the takeover by New Capital International Investment, ING Group still owned the same number of shares, but decreased to 13.16% of total share capital; the largest shareholder was Sense Control International Limited for 16.63%, a company owned by Lin Si Yu (Chinese: 林思雨).

As of 31 December 2016, China Development Bank International Investment was majority owned by Chinese stated-owned China Development Bank.

== See also ==
- Cayman Islands company law
- Belt and Road Initiative
