= Silk Road Fund =

Chinese state-owned investment fund

- Type: State backed investment fund
- Industry: Investment management
- Founded: 2014; 12 years ago
- Headquarters: 2/F Tower B, Winland IFC, 7 Financial Street, Beijing
- Key people: Jin Qi (Chairman of The board of directors); Wang Yanzhi (Executive Director and President); Yang Zejun (chairman of the board of Supervisors)
- AUM: US$40 billion (2023)
- Owner: State Administration of Foreign Exchange, Export Import Bank of China, China Investment Corporation, China Development Bank
- Website: www.silkroadfund.com.cn

Silk Road Fund
- Simplified Chinese: 丝路基金
Transcriptions

The Silk Road Fund (Chinese: 丝路基金) is a China Government Guidance Fund to foster increased investment in countries along the Belt and Road Initiative (formerly One Belt, One Road), an economic development initiative primarily covering Eurasia. The Chinese government pledged US$40 billion for the creation of the investment fund, established on 29 December 2014.

== Significance ==
The Silk Road Fund is the only one of China's sovereign funds which was formed with an explicit geo-economic strategic mission. It was created by Chinese leader Xi Jinping to advance the policies and priorities of the Belt and Road Initiative and has closely followed the BRI's focus on infrastructure, connectivity, resource development, and developing industrial capacity.

As per China's pledges via the Forum on China-Africa Cooperation (FOCAC), the Silk Road Fund is among the Chinese institutions which have provided development funds to African countries. Along with the China Development Bank and the Export-Import Bank of China, the Silk Road Fund is one of the primary financing sources for BRI projects in Africa.

== Personnel ==
The senior executives are all from four shareholders and officials from People's Bank of China have taken most of the posts as the biggest holder, State Administration of Foreign Exchange, is a subordinate body of the Central Bank. For instance, the chairman of the board of directors, Jin Qi, was formerly the assistant governor of the People's Bank of China. And the most important executive post, General Manager, was assigned to Wang Yanzhi, the Director of Foreign Exchange Reserves to Entrust Loan Office of State Administration of Foreign Exchange.

The structures of board of directors and supervisors represent the balance of power between OBOR related institutions. In the board of directors, four relevant ministries of the State Council of China, including Ministry of Foreign Affairs, National Development and Reform Commission, Ministry of Finance and Ministry of Commerce, and four shareholders respectively send one midlevel official to delegate in the board. In the board of supervisors, with Yang Zejun, former Secretary-general of the Office of the Central Financial Leadership Group, acting as chairman, senior executives from CIC, CDB and IEBC share the seats with two other staff representatives.

The Silk Road Fund's management arm is the Silk Road Fund Company.

== Stakeholders ==
Unlike other funds, whose organizational forms are mainly limited partnership, private equity (PE) in particular, Silk Road Fund is a limited liability company. Its 4 shareholders are: State Administration of Foreign Exchange (65%), China Investment Corporation (15%), Export-Import Bank of China (15%) and China Development Bank (5%). Its initial capital was US$40 billion and ¥100 billion.

== Connections with People's Bank of China ==
Silk Road Fund is semi-directly under the supervision of People's Bank of China. Its Party Organizational Relations are under the management of PBOC. For instance, on 18 January 2016, the Governor of PBOC, Zhou Xiaochuan participated in the Meeting of Democratic Life with the Party Committee of Silk Road Fund and gave instructions on Fund operation and Party building after the management team reported the work and their criticism and self-criticism. In the Chinese political system, participation in Meeting of Democratic Life means supervision and superiority.

== Investments ==
Until August 2017, the committed investment of Silk Road Fund is US$6 billion and equity investment accounts for nearly 80%, according to the chairman JIN Qi, and the number of its invested projects was 15 by May 2017.

- (Kenya) Part of the initial fund was invested in the construction of a Mombasa–Nairobi Standard Gauge Railway.
- US$1.65-billion investment in the Karot Hydropower Project and other hydropower projects in the region as part of the China-Pakistan Economic Corridor
- (Russia) Acquisition of 9.9% of Yamal LNG project, a liquefied natural gas project in Sabetta, located north-east of the Yamal Peninsula, from Novatek
- (United Arab Emirates) Dubai Hassyan Clean Coal Powerplant, co-invested with Harbin Electric International of China
- (United Arab Emirates) 24% equity stake in 4th phase of the Mohammed bin Rashid Al Maktoum Solar Park, which is the largest single-site investment project that combines CSP and photovoltaic technology using the IPP model.
- Acquisition of 9.9% of PJSC SIBUR Holdings, a giant energy company of Russia.
- (Italy) Acquisition of 5% of Autostrade per l'Italia, the major Italian highway concessionaire, covering nearly the whole country (3.000 km)

The Karot Hydropower Project was the fund's first project. It was announced on 20 April 2015 during Xi Jinping's visit to Islamabad, Pakistan.

The Silk Road Fund is a part owner of the Astana International Financial Centre.

== See also ==
- Danantara
