= Karot Hydropower Project =

- Location within Pakistan
- Official name: Karot Hydropower Project
- Location: Punjab, Pakistan
- Coordinates: 33°35′59.29″N 073°36′4.42″E
- Status: Operational
- Construction began: December 2016
- Opening date: June 2022
- Construction cost: $1.42 billion
- Owner: China Three Gorges Corporation (CTG)

Dam and spillways
- Type of dam: Embankment, rock-fill
- Impounds: Jhelum River
- Height: 95.5 m (313 ft)
- Length: 460 m (1,510 ft)

Reservoir
- Total capacity: 164.5 million
- Maximum length: 27 km (17 mi)
- Normal elevation: 461 m (1,512 ft)

Power Station
- Commission date: June 2022
- Turbines: 4 x 180 MW Francis-type
- Installed capacity: 720 MW
- Annual generation: 3,436 GWH

The Karot Hydropower Project is an asphalt-core rockfill gravity dam in Pakistan, with an installed capacity of 720 MW. The project is sponsored by Chinese state-owned company China Three Gorges Corporation (CTG).

It is the first investment project of the Silk Road Fund, and is part of the much larger China–Pakistan Economic Corridor (CPEC).

The project was successfully commissioned on June 29, 2022.

== Location ==
The Karot Hydropower Project is located on Jhelum River near Karot village, some 1.7 kilometers upstream of Karot Bridge and 74 km upstream of Mangla Dam. The Project site is accessible through the Islamabad – Kahuta – Kotli road, approximately 29 kilometers from Kahuta, and 65 kilometers from Islamabad.

== History ==
The Jhelum River is the largest river of Indus Basin River System, and its hydropower potential was identified by various studies carried out by international agencies, with the first report issued by the Canadian Consultant group MONENCO in 1983, followed by a 1994 study by the German Agency for Technical Cooperation (GTZ) that formally proposed the Karot Hydropower Project.

On April 20, 2015, during a state visit by Xi Jinping to Pakistan, the investment in the project by China's Silk Road Fund was announced.

On September 28, 2016, the federal and Azad Jammu and Kashmir governments signed an implementation agreement with a Chinese consortium for development and operation on river Jhelum at a levelised tariff of 7.57 cents per unit for 30 years. Financial close of the project was achieved in February 2017 while land acquisition was also completed.

Groundbreaking on the project took place on January 10, 2016. The project was successfully commissioned on June 29, 2022.

== Project details ==
The major project features include a 95.5 meters high asphalt-core rockfill gravity dam with a crest length of 320 meters near the village of Gohra. The dam's reservoir is approximately 164.5 million cubic meters in volume, with a length of 27 kilometers. 72 homes and 58 businesses are relocated as a result of construction, while 2.8 kilometers of the Karot-Kotli road, and 8.9 kilometers of the Azad Pattan-Kahuta road are also relocated.

The power intake structure is constructed on right bank of the river immediately upstream of Dam site and diverts the water into headrace tunnels entering into Cavern Powerhouse. The water is discharged back to River Jhelum through tail-race channel located at right bank of the River Jhelum immediately downstream of Karot village. The dam generates mean annual energy 3,436 GWh, and is connected to Pakistan's national electricity grid.

SMEC International Pty Ltd is participating as Employer's Engineer, who is providing services for project management, design review and construction supervision for 720 MW Karot hydropower project.

== Financing ==
During Xi's April 20, 2015 visit, the Silk Road Fund's management arm (the Silk Road Fund Company) signed a memorandum of understanding with the China Three Gorges Dam Corporation and the Pakistan Private Power and Infrastructure Board to finance the project.

Total cost for the project is estimated to be $2 billion, and is funded by International Finance Corporation, China's Silk Road Fund. The Export-Import Bank of China and China Development Bank issued loans to the Karot Power Company. It is built on a "Build-Own-Operate-Transfer" basis for 30 years, after which ownership will be turned over to the government of Pakistan.

The company will run and maintain the project for 30 years at a levelised tariff of 7.57 cents per unit after which it will be transferred to the Punjab government at a notional price of Rs.1.
