= National Fund for Technology Transfer and Commercialisation =

Chinese state-owned investment fund

- Native name: 国家科技成果转化引导基金
- Company type: State-owned enterprise
- Industry: Investment management
- Founded: 2011; 15 years ago
- Headquarters: Beijing, China
- Key people: Ma Weihua (Chairman)
- AUM: ¥62.4 billion RMB (US$8.7 billion)
- Parent: Ministry of Science and Technology; Ministry of Finance
- Website: www.nfttc.org.cn

The National Fund for Technology Transfer and Commercialisation (NFTTC; Chinese: 国家科技成果转化引导基金; pinyin: Guójiā Kējì Chéngguǒ Zhuǎnhuà Yǐndǎo Jījīn) is a China Government Guidance Fund. The fund aims to support the government and public institutions in the commercialization process of their scientific findings and new technologies. Using a fund of funds approach, it invests into multiple sub-funds which in turn invests in enterprises and projects.

== History ==
In 2011, the Ministry of Science and Technology and Ministry of Finance established the outline and framework for the NFTTC as a way to support China's National Medium and Long-Term program for Science and Technology Development (2006–2020) plan.

In 2014, the NFTTC was launched to transform research projects into business ventures.

In 2015, it invested 1 billion yuan (US$145 million) in establishing three venture capital funds.

In November 2021, Securities Times reported that there would be major revisions to the direction and management of the NFTTC so it would become more market-orientated. For example, there would be more focus on the use of equity investments, the investment managers would have more autonomy and there was more clarification on the investment stages.

In December 2021, the NFTTC made its largest capital injection, when it set up a sub-fund with the governments in Guangdong, Hubei and Chengdu as well as a number of financial institutions.

By the end of 2022, Economic Information Daily had reported the NFTTC had set up 36 sub-funds to invest nearly 36 billion yuan into 616 enterprises leading to the commercialization of 974 science and technology achievements.

== Fund details ==
The NFTTC has four key features:

- A national database that contains outcomes and findings from research projects
- A venture capital function
- Loan risk compensation for banks
- Performance incentives

The NFTTC focuses on China's hi-tech sector such as information technology, biotechnology and new materials. It has made investments alongside other institutional investors such as private equity funds and government backed funds. It is required to keep its total investments in all sub-funds between 20%-30% and shall not be a major shareholder in any sub-fund.
