= Zheng Zhijie =

Chinese politician and economist (born 1958)

- 郑之杰
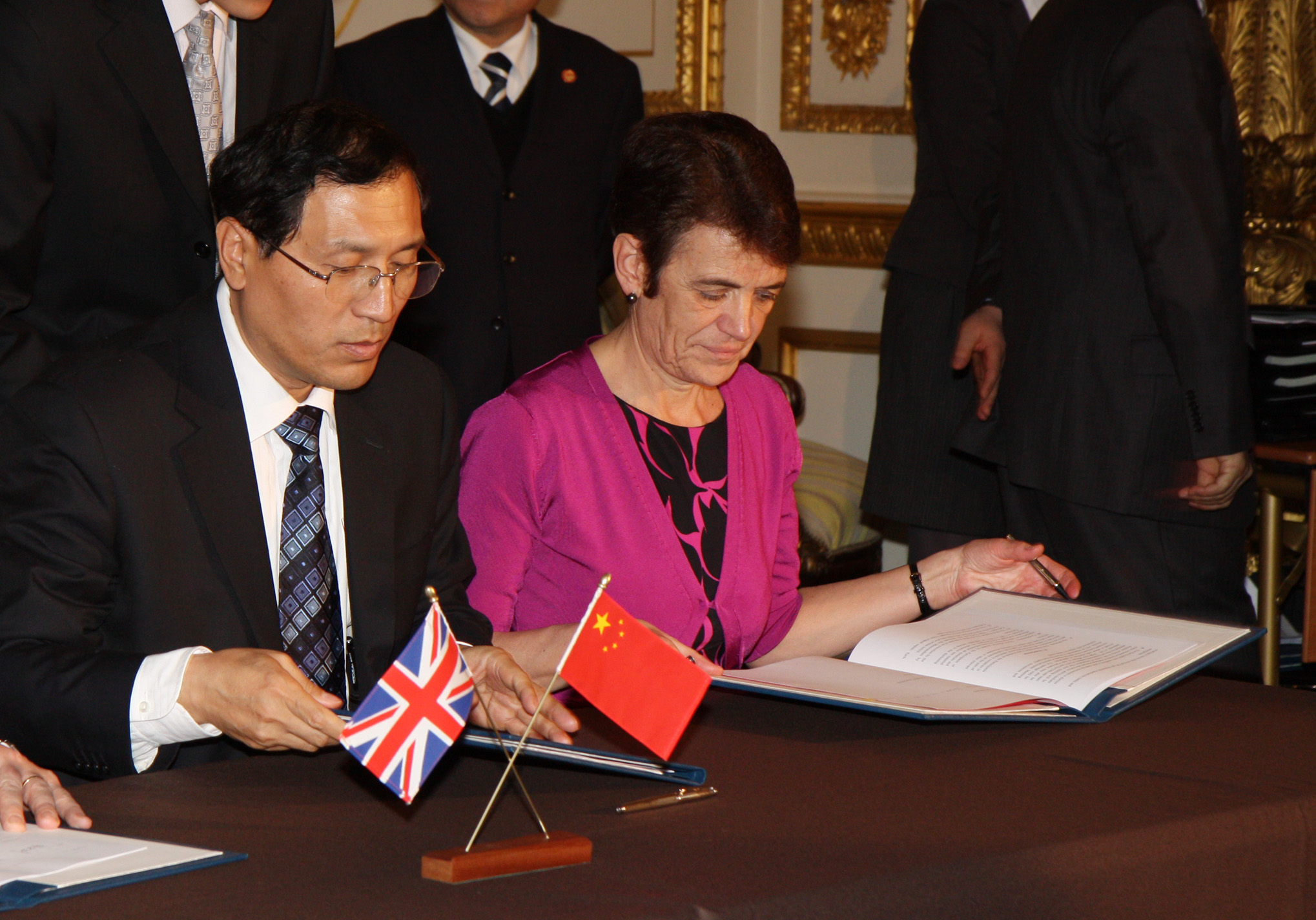
- Zheng Zhijie (left) and Susan Haird, Acting Chief Executive of UK Trade & Investment on 10 January 2011

Governor of China Development Bank
- In office October 2012 – October 2019
- Preceded by: Jiang Chaoliang
- Succeeded by: Ouyang Weimin

Vice-Governor of China Development Bank
- In office December 2008 – October 2012

Vice-Governor of China Construction Bank
- In office 2001–2008

Personal details
- Born: May 1958 (age 68)
- Party: Chinese Communist Party
- Education: Dongbei University of Finance and Economics

Zheng Zhijie (simplified Chinese: 郑之杰; traditional Chinese: 鄭之杰; pinyin: Zhèng Zhījié; born May 1958) is a Chinese politician and economist currently serving as governor of China Development Bank.

== Biography ==
Born in May 1958, Zheng graduated from Dongbei University of Finance and Economics in 1982.

After graduation, he was assigned to the China Construction Bank. He served as vice-governor of China Construction Bank's Beijing Branch from 1992 to 1997 and governor of Beijing Branch from 1997 to 2001. In 2001 he was promoted to become vice-governor of China Construction Bank and CEO of the China Jianyin Investment Ltd., and held that offices until 2008. In December 2008, he was appointed vice-governor of China Development Bank, he remained in that position until October 2012, when he was promoted again to become its governor.

On November 22, 2016, Zheng was hired as a part-time professor at Nankai University.

Government offices
Preceded by Jiang Chaoliang	Governor of China Development Bank; 2012–2019	Succeeded by Ouyang Weimin
