= Jidong Cement =

Chinese cement company

Tangshan Jidong Cement Co., Ltd.
- Industry: Cement
- Founded: 1994
- Headquarters: Tangshan, Hebei
- Key people: Yu Jiuzhou (General Manager)
- Products: Cement
- Revenue: US$ 2.36 billion (2012)
- Number of employees: 9,000
- Parent: Jidong Development Group
- Website: jdsn.com.cn

Tangshan Jidong Cement Co., Ltd. SZSE: 000401 is a Chinese cement manufacturing company, ranked the 6th largest manufacturer of cement in the world by Global Cement Magazine based on 2011 data. The cement maker is part of the Jidong Development Group, a holding company with interests in machinery, real estate, and production of other construction materials.

Jidong expanded outside of China for the first time in 2010 when it entered into a deal to build a new cement plant in Limpopo, South Africa. The US$221 million investment was funded by a consortium that included the China Africa Development Fund, Chinese commercial banks, and Nedbank, along with equity stakes by Continental Cement and Women Investment Portfolio Holdings. In an interview with The Financial Times, Chen Ying, an executive of Jidong Development Group, explained that the investment was driven by his belief that Africa would progress and grow as fast as China. Before the investment, in 2007 Jidong and Women Investment Portfolio Holdings, a black women empowerment themed fund, had already partnered up to deliver Dunshi branded cement in South Africa. The new plant was enthusiastically welcomed by South African publication Moneyweb which predicted the new facility would "shake [the] industry to its foundations" because it would shatter the "old cement cartel".
