= Azad Pattan Hydropower Project =

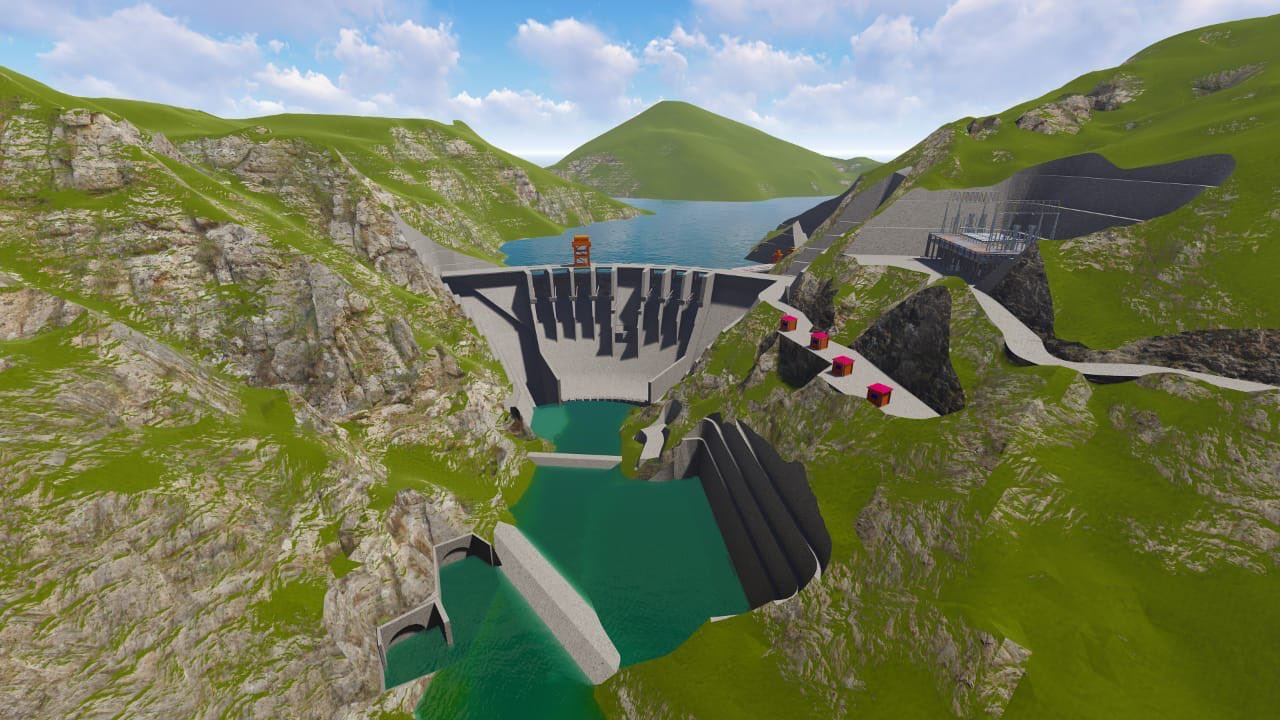
- Project Layout

- Location within Pakistan
- Interactive map of Azad Pattan Hydropower Project
- Country: Pakistan
- Location: Sudhanoti District, Azad Kashmir
- Coordinates: 33°46′3.9″N 73°34′17.45″E
- Opening date: 2026
- Construction cost: $1.517 billion
- Owners: China Ghezouba Group, Laraib Group

Dam and spillways
- Type of dam: Gravity dam, Run of the river
- Impounds: Jhelum River
- Height: 90 m (295 ft)
- Length: 80 m (262 ft)

Power Station
- Turbines: 4 x 160 MW
- Installed capacity: 700 MW (10% continuous overload)
- Annual generation: 3064 GWh

The Azad Pattan Hydropower Project is a 700.7 MW hydroelectric power station on the Jhelum River roughly 7 km upstream of Azad Pattan Bridge in the Sudhanoti District, Azad Jammu and Kashmir, Pakistan and 90 km from Islamabad, the capital city of Pakistan. The project is scheduled for completion by 2026.

Upon finalizing the EPC and other associated costs, the project company submitted its EPC tariff proposal on 23 June 2017. Following an intensive evaluation process, NEPRA determined the tariff vide Determination dated 17 May 2018. Tariff of US ¢ 7.12/kWh (levelized) was determined for the 30-year term; with an average of US ¢ 5.93/kWh. The average and levelized tariff for the first 10 years is US ¢ 8.13/kWh while the average tariff for the next 20 years is US ¢ 4.83/kWh (levelized US ¢ 5.20/kWh). This has the distinction of being the lowest tariff of all the large private hydropower projects (over 500MW) on rivers in Pakistan.

The JCC (Joint Cooperation Committee) for CPEC related projects conducted a study on power market of Pakistan, which led to the decision that both sides will discuss the inclusion of the project at the fifth Expert Panel meeting. Later project was added in CPEC.

In July 2020, the project's $1.5 billion investment agreement was signed between Chinese state-owned China Gezhouba Group and the government of Pakistan, in a ceremony attended by then Prime Minister Imran Khan and some ministers.

== See also ==
- List of power stations in Pakistan
- New Bong Escape Hydropower Project
- Patrind Hydropower Project
- Gulpur Hydropower Project
- Mangla Dam
