= Logicor =

European warehouse and logistics company

- Company type: Private
- Industry: Warehouse and logistics company
- Founded: 2012; 13 years ago
- Founder: Blackstone Group
- Headquarters: London, Luxembourg, United Kingdom
- Number of locations: 19 (2024)
- Area served: Europe
- Products: Warehouses, logistics
- Owner: China Investment Corporation
- Number of employees: 300 (2024)
- Website: www.logicor.eu

Logicor is a European warehouse and logistics company with head offices in London and Luxembourg. Founded in 2012 by Blackstone Group, by 2017 Logicor was operating over 630 properties. Logicor was purchased by China Investment Corporation in 2017. In no way is or was Logicor related to Logikor. Logikor is another logistics company founded in 2005 in Canada, with offices in Canada, the United Kingdom, and the United States.

== History ==
=== Founding ===
Logicor was founded by Blackstone Group's real estate division in 2012 to manage and operate Blackstone's logistics assets in Europe. Blackstone began accumulating distribution centers and warehouses in 2012 in Europe using the Logicor name. Among clients in the next five years were Amazon.com, and by 2017 it was the largest owner "of European modern logistics and distribution properties," with 13.6 million square meters of property in Europe. It had also acquired assets in Britain and a logistics portfolio in Spain. By 2017, Logicor was operating over 630 properties. About 40 percent of Logicor's enterprise value was made up of debt.

=== Sale ===
In 2017 Blackstone Group began advertising Logicor, while also planning to sell the company in an IPO if it couldn't get the desired price privately. In May 2017, Blackstone hired advisers to sell Logicor. BlackstonePrivate bidders included China Investment Corp. (CIC) and three institutions from Singapore: Mapletree Investments, Temasek and GIC. On May 31, 2017, it was reported that CIC was in advanced talks to possibly purchase a Logicor from Blackstone GroupLP for $13.49 billion. Other companies were also bidding for Logicor, although CIC was said to be in the lead. CIC won the bidding war against Mapletree and Temasek, and completed the transaction in November 2017.

== See also ==
- Jonathan D. Gray
