= Cai Esheng =

Chinese politician

- 蔡鄂生

Vice President of the China Banking Regulatory Commission
- In office December 2005 – May 2013
- President: Liu Mingkang; Shang Fulin

Personal details
- Born: 1951 (age 74–75) Hubei, China
- Party: Chinese Communist Party (expelled in 2022)
- Education: Shanxi University of Finance and Economics; Central Party School of the Chinese Communist Party

Cai Esheng (Chinese: 蔡鄂生; pinyin: Cài Èshēng; born 1951) is a retired Chinese politician who served as vice president of the China Banking Regulatory Commission between 2005 and 2013. He has retired for 8 years. As of July 2021 he was under investigation by China's top anti-corruption agency.

== Early life and education ==
Born in Hubei, in 1951, Cai was a sent-down youth in Jiang County from December 1968 to December 1970. He enlisted in the People's Liberation Army (PLA) in December 1970. After retiring from the military, he became an official in the Haidian District Office of the Beijing Branch of the People's Bank of China in April 1975. After resuming the college entrance examination, in 1978, he was accepted to Shanxi University of Finance and Economics, where he majored in finance and monetary policy.

== Career ==
After university in 1982, Cai was despatched to the People's Bank of China. He served in several posts in the bank, including director of the 3rd Division of the Financial Management Department, director of the Financial Restructuring Division of the Comprehensive Planning Department, director of the Planning and Pilot Division of the Financial System Reform Department, deputy director of Interest Rate Savings Management Department, director of the Financial Management Department, director of the Banking Department, and director of the 2nd Banking Supervision Department. He was promoted to assistant to the governor in September 1998, concurrently serving as governor of its Shanghai Branch since February 2000.

In May 2001, he was appointed president of the supervisory board of State-owned Commercial Banks, and held that office until December 2005, when he was chosen as vice president of the China Banking Regulatory Commission.

== Downfall ==
On 30 July 2021, Cai was put under investigation for alleged "serious violations of discipline and laws" by the Central Commission for Discipline Inspection (CCDI), the party's internal disciplinary body, and the National Supervisory Commission, the highest anti-corruption agency of China.

He was expelled from the Chinese Communist Party (CCP) in January 2022. He was arrested by the Supreme People's Procuratorate and was indicted on charges of bribery and abuse of power in June of the same year.

He stood trial at the Intermediate People's Court of Zhenjiang on 13 July 2023. He was charged with accepting money and property worth about 500 million yuan ($72 million) directly or through his relatives. According to the indictment, he allegedly took advantage of his positions to seek benefits for others in financing loans, business contracting, job promotion, equity transfer, financing loans, work adjustments between 2006 and 2021. He received a death sentence in December 2023 with a two-year reprieve for accepting bribes and abusing his power. However, if he avoided further offenses during the period, his sentence could be commuted to life imprisonment without parole.

Government offices
Preceded by Wu Xiaoling	President of the Shanghai Branch of the People's Bank of China; 2000–2001	Succeeded by Hu Pingxi
