= China Investment Corporation =

Chinese sovereign wealth fund

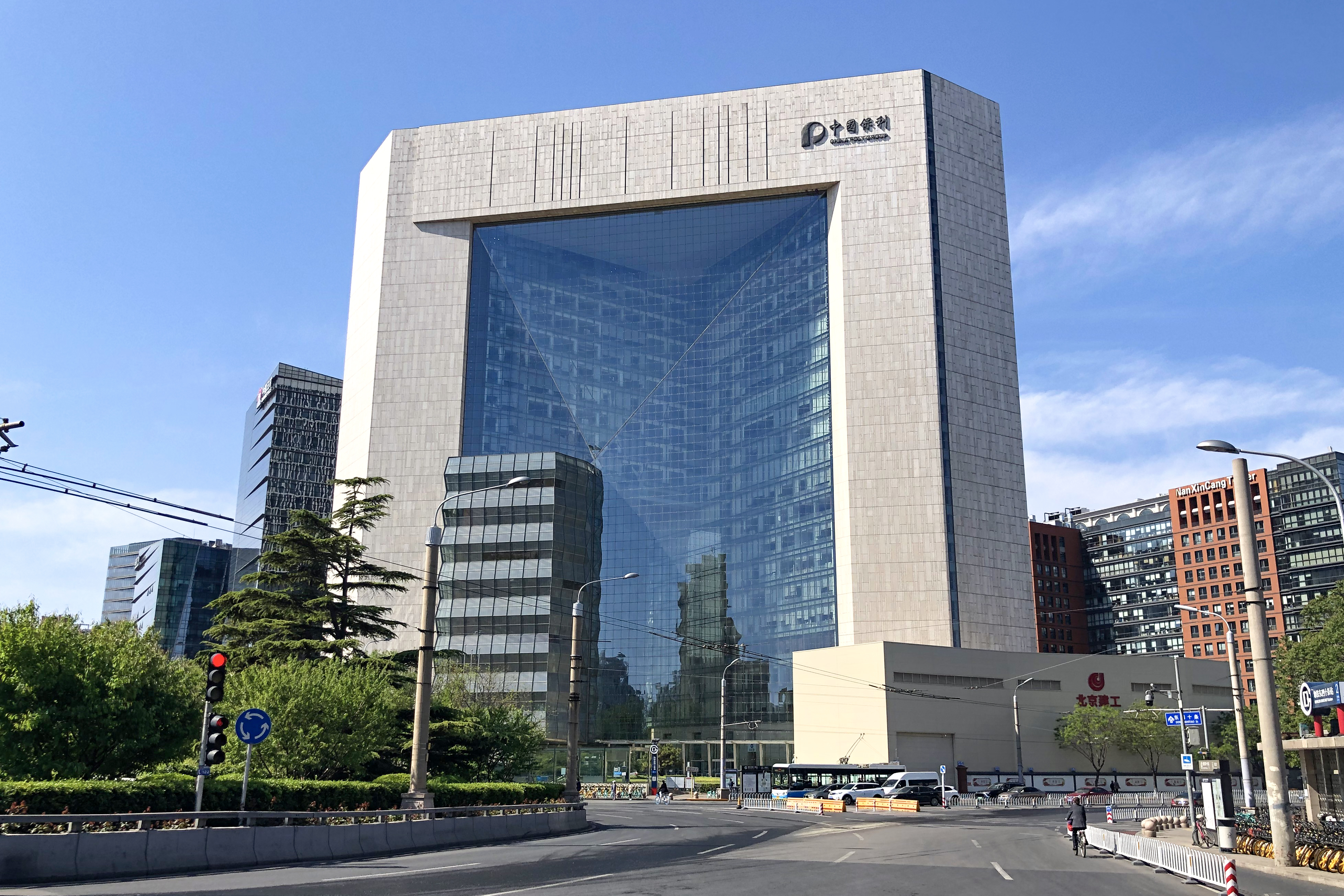
- Headquarters at New Beijing Poly Plaza
- Native name: 中国投资有限责任公司
- Type: Sovereign wealth fund
- Industry: Investment service
- Founded: 2007; 19 years ago
- Headquarters: Beijing, China
- Key people: Zhang Qingsong (Chairman and CEO); Liu Haoling (Vice Chairman, President and CIO)
- Operating income: ▲US$118.012 billion (2019)
- Net income: ▲US$110.313 billion (2019)
- AUM: ▲US$1.567 trillion (2026)
- Total assets: ▲US$1.330 trillion (2025)
- Total equity: ▲US$946.934 billion (2019)
- Number of employees: 689 (2019)
- Subsidiaries: Central Huijin Investment; CIC International; CIC Capital; Best Investment Corporation; Fullbloom Investment Corporation; Chengdong Investment Corporation
- Website: www.china-inv.cn/en/

China Investment Corporation (CIC) is a sovereign wealth fund that manages part of China's foreign exchange reserves. China's largest sovereign fund, CIC was established in 2007 with about US$200 billion of assets under management. In May 2026 the fund had US$1.567 trillion in assets under management.

== History ==
As of 2007, the People's Republic of China had US$1.4 trillion in currency reserves. That year, the China Investment Corporation was established with the intent of using these reserves for the benefit of the state by investing abroad in investments that are higher risk and higher reward than government bonds.

CIC's funding resulted from the state use of leverage and is therefore unlike most non-Chinese sovereign funds, which tend to be funded through state revenue from national resources like oil. CIC was capitalized as follows: (1) the Ministry of Finance issued bonds, (2) the Ministry of Finance used the proceeds of the bond issuance to buy foreign exchange reserves from the People's Bank of China, and (3) these reserves were used to fund CIC.

The state-owned Central Huijin Investment Corporation was merged into CIC as a wholly owned subsidiary, a process that was completed in 2008. To acquire Central Huijin from the State Administration of Foreign Exchange, CIC paid $67 billion of its initial $200 billion capital. Central Huijin manages more than two-thirds of CIC's assets.

In 2008, CIC joined the International Forum of Sovereign Wealth Funds and signed up to the Santiago Principles on best practice in managing sovereign wealth funds. CIC also sought to improve its credibility by assembling an international advisory council of important individuals from the West.

CIC's early foreign investment activities resulted in losses, as it significantly invested in the United States financial sector just before the 2008 financial crisis. As a result, it shifted its focus in 2009 to prioritize investments in natural resources. It also replaced its previous asset-class based divisions with new divisions organized based on strategic priorities: Public Market Investments, Tactical Investments, Private Market Investments, and Special Investments.

In 2009, the Ministry of Finance converted its ownership of $200 billion of CIC's debt into equity, a result which relieved CIC of interest payments on the special treasury bonds that had initially capitalized it and instead resulted in CIC paying an annual dividend to the Ministry of Finance. CIC has owned the Fullbloom Investment Corporation as a subsidiary since at least 2009.

In 2010, CIC established a new subsidiary, CIC International (Hong Kong) Co in Hong Kong and appointed Lawrence Lau as its chairman.

In 2011, CIC established its first foreign office in Toronto, Canada.

=== Chairman Ding Xuedong's tenure ===
In July 2013, the Chinese Communist Party appointed Ding Xuedong as CIC's chairman. Ding oversaw a restructuring of CIC and an increased focus on internal discipline. He required senior executives and over 400 CIC employees to submit self-criticisms in which they detailed their errors, apologized, and pledged not to repeat those errors.

Under Ding's tenure, an audit begun under predecessor Lou Jiwei was concluded. The audit found that CIC's early losses were primarily due to dereliction of duty by key personnel, inadequate due diligence, inadequate post-investment management, and a general lack of professionalism. Amid the nationwide anti-corruption campaign in 2015, CIC launched an internal investigation in which 495 personnel from CIC and its subsidiaries were disciplined.

CIC's investment strategy changed during Ding's tenure, with an increased focus on the agricultural sector, including industries such as irrigation and animal feed, which other institutional investors have tended to overlook. Other points of emphasis during Ding's time as CIC Chair included technology, real estate, and infrastructure investments.

In 2014, CIC contributed some of the initial capital for the Silk Road Fund.

In January 2015, CIC made its Special Investments Division into a separate, wholly owned subsidiary called CIC Capital. This move was intended to support the Belt and Road Initiative including by conducting foreign direct investment and by supporting state-owned enterprises of China engaged in mergers and acquisitions in economic sectors prioritized by the state.

During Ding's tenure, CIC closed its Toronto office, moving its foreign office presence to New York.

The Communist Party viewed Ding's tenure at CIC as a success and in February 2017 promoted Ding to secretary general of the State Council.

=== Vice Chairman Tu Guangshao's tenure ===
CIC Vice Chairman and general manager Tu Guangshao led CIC for a two-year period following Ding's promotion to the State Council. CIC did not have a chairman during this period.

Tu supervised CIC's continued process of aligning its investments with the priorities of the Belt and Road Initiative. Responding to Western countries' hostility to Chinese state-led investment, Tu established a strategy of CIC partnering with well-established Western institutions including Goldman Sachs to form cooperation funds that could better satisfy the requirements of foreign direct investment screening processes.

=== Chairman Peng Chun's tenure ===
In April 2019, Peng Chun was appointed CIC's Chairman.

Peng has continued former Vice Chairman Tu Guangshao's cooperation fund strategy. In 2020, CIC formed the France-China Cooperation Fund, the China-Italy Industrial Cooperation Fund, the UK-China Cooperation Fund, and the Japan-China Industrial Cooperation Fund.

Under Peng's leadership, CIC unwound its 2015 spinoff of CIC Capital as a separate subsidiary.

In early 2024 Liu Haoling became Vice Chairman, President and CIO of CIC.

In December 2024, Peng Chun was replaced by Zhang Qingsong as chairman and CEO.

=== Notable individual investments ===
In September 2013, the fund acquired a 12.5% stake in Russian potash fertiliser company Uralkali for a rumoured $2 billion through its subsidiary Chengdong Investment Corporation.

In March 2014, CIC acquired a $40 million stake in iKang Health Group. In October 2015, the CIC provided capital in a deal between Carnival Corporation and China State Shipbuilding Corporation

In October 2015, CSSC Carnival Cruise Shipping, a joint venture between the CIC, the China State Shipbuilding Corporation, and Carnival Corporation & plc, was founded, with operations expected to commence in 2019.

CIC invested $3 billion together with Goldman Sachs into US-based Boyd in 2018.

=== Real estate investments ===
In August 2009, CIC and Qatar Holding became the two largest shareholders of Songbird Estates, the parent company of London's Canary Warf Group. Canary Wharf is home to several major financial institutions, including Barclays and HSBC. Earlier that year, CIC had already purchased a 19% stake in Songbird Estates. In November 2012, CIC entered into a joint venture with Invesco Real Estate to acquire the Winchester House in London from German fund manager KanAm for $389 million. The building was used as the London headquarters of Deutsche Bank at the time. In May 2023, it was sold for $316 million, resulting in a financial loss. Also in November 2012, CIC purchased a 10% stake in Heathrow Airport Holdings for $726 million, consisting of a 5.7% stake from Ferrovial and a 4.3% stake from FGP Topco.

In early 2014 CIC completed its purchase of the Chiswick Business Park in London from the Blackstone Group for about £800 million.

In December 2016, CIC acquired a 45% stake in the office skyscraper 1221 Avenue of the Americas, New York City, for $1 billion, which valued the building at $2.3 billion. In November 2017, CIC purchased Logicor, a European warehouse company, from The Blackstone Group L.P. for $13.49 billion. Other companies were also bidding for Logicor.

As of January 2023, CIC owns over 250 properties in Britain though various companies. These properties include key logistics and distribution centres for food and consumer goods in different regions of the UK.

=== Financial institutions ===
In 2007, CIC invested $5.5 billion in US investment bank Morgan Stanley through its subsidiary Best Investment Corporation. At the time of the investment, Morgan Stanley had suffered massive trading losses. In 2009, CIC purchased $1.2 billion of common stock in Morgan Stanley. In July of the following year, CIC sold shares valued at $264 to $396.5 million, reducing its stake to under 10 per cent.

In May 2007, CIC bought a $3 billion stake (constituting 9.9% of nonvoting shares) in the Blackstone Group, shortly before Blackstone's public listing. In 2012, CIC sold most of its 3 per cent stake in the company. CIC left the relationship in February 2018 via Beijing Wonderful Investments.

In July 2009, CIC acquired a 40 per cent stake in the CITIC Group. In December the following year, the fund joined a consortium investing $1.8 billion in BTG Pactual. In 2011, CIC invested $100 million in VTB Bank. In 2012, the fund bought a minority stake in EIG Global Energy Partners.

== Impact ==
In addition to its pursuit of financial returns, CIC's investments are also intended to promote China's national interests. For example, its investments in natural resources both support China's development and support the Communist Party's strategic priorities.

Having entered the global market in 2007 shortly before the 2008 financial crisis, CIC's initial performance was lackluster. This created a political opportunity for the State Administration of Foreign Exchange in 2013 to expand the sovereign funds under its jurisdiction.

CIC is among the worldwide sovereign funds whose investments tend to prompt other institutional investors to perceive investing alongside the fund as comparatively more safe.

CIC has been described as a unicorn-maker for its role in fueling the growth of Chinese tech sector through its early support of Alibaba and DiDi. It has also provided important funding to companies in China's semiconductor industry.

== Governance ==
The management and board of the China Investment Corporation ultimately reports to the State Council of the People's Republic of China. The China Investment Corporation is seen as being "firmly entrenched" in the political establishment as the composition of its board of directors implies "considerable influence on the part of China's Ministry of Finance."

=== Board of directors ===
The board of directors is composed of the members listed below:

- Chairman & CEO - Zhang Qingsong
- Vice Chairman, President & CIO - Liu Haoling
- Executive Director - Liu Jinbo
- Non-Executive Director - Cong Liang
- Non-Executive Director - Liao Min
- Non-Executive Director - Li Fei
- Non-Executive Director - Li Hongyan
- Non-Executive Director - Lu Lei
- Independent Director - Li Jiange
- Independent Director - Bai Chong'en
- Employee Director - Zhang Geping

=== Executive committee ===
The executive committee is composed of the members listed below:

- Chairman & CEO - Zhang Qingsong
- Vice Chairman, President & CIO - Liu Haoling
- Executive Director - Liu Jinbo
- Executive Vice President & CSO - Zhao Haiying
- Executive Vice President & CRO - Liu Haoling
- Executive Vice President - Liu Jiawang
- Executive Vice President - Chen Zhong
- Chief Inspector - Pan Yuehan
- Member of the Executive Committee - Bao Jianmin
- Member of the Executive Committee - Liu Yanbin
- Member of the Executive Committee - Xu Zhinbin

=== International Advisory Council ===
The International Advisory Council is composed of the members listed below:

Asia

- Zhou Xiaochun (China)
- Shaukat Aziz (Pakistan)
- Justin Yifu Lin (China)
- Frederick Ma (Hong Kong, China)
- Andrew Sheng (Malaysia)

Africa

- Omari Issa (Tanzania)
- John H. Maree (South Africa)

Americas

- John L. Thornton (United States of America)
- Andrónico Luksic (Chile)

Europe

- Jean Lemierre (France)
- Gerhard Schröder (Germany)
- Lord Sassoon (United Kingdom)

Secretariat

- Chen Jia

== Subsidiaries and minority interests ==
- GDF Suez Exploration & Production International S.A. (30%; joint venture with Engie)

== See also ==
- Foreign-exchange reserves of China
- People's Bank of China
- Sovereign wealth fund
- State Administration of Foreign Exchange
- SSBT OD05 Omnibus
