= Ouyang Weimin =

Chinese politician (born 1970)

- 欧阳卫民

President of the China Development Bank
- In office October 2019 – May 2023
- Preceded by: Zheng Zhijie
- Succeeded by: Tan Jiong

Vice Governor of Guangdong
- In office January 2018 – November 2019
- Governor: Ma Xingrui

Personal details
- Born: January 1963 (age 63) Hengyang, Hunan, China
- Party: Chinese Communist Party (1986-)
- Education: Hunan Economy Institute (BEc); Zhongnan University of Economics (MEc); Fudan University (PhD)

Ouyang Weimin (Chinese: 欧阳卫民; born January 1963) is a former Chinese politician, who was served as the deputy head of the president of the China Development Bank from 2019 to 2023, and the vice governor of Guangdong province from 2018 to 2019.

== Career ==
=== Education ===
Ouyang was born in Hengyang, Hunan in January 1963. In 1979, he was enrolled to the department of planning and statistics of Hunan Economy Institute (now merged to Hunan University) and transferred to the economy department of Zhongnan University of Economics in 1983. In 1986, he was served as an instructor of Zhongnan University of Economics, and enrolled to the economy department of Fudan University in 1988.

=== People's Bank of China ===
After graduating in 1991, Ouyang was enrolled to the People's Bank of China and served as an officer. He was appointed as the president of Xiamen branch of the PBC.

In 2003, Ouyang was appointed as the director of the China Anti-Money Laundering Monitoring and Analysis Center. In 2007, he was appointed as the director of the Payment and Settlement Department of the PBC.

=== Guangdong ===
In August 2011, Ouyang was transferred to Guangzhou and appointed as the deputy mayor. He was concurrently served as the party secretary of Zengcheng in December 2013 (Zengcheng was reorganized into district in May 2015, and no longer served as the party secretary in July 2015) and the standing member of the CCP Guangzhou Municipal Committee in June 2014.

In December 2016, Ouyang was appointed as the deputy party secretary of Guangzhou.

In January 2018, Ouyang was appointed as the vice governor of Guangdong.

=== China Development Bank ===
In October 2019, Ouyang was appointed as the president of the China Development Bank, and no longer served in May 2023.

== Investigation ==
On 19 July 2026, Ouyang was suspected of "serious violations of laws and regulations" by the Central Commission for Discipline Inspection (CCDI), the party's internal disciplinary body, and the National Supervisory Commission, the highest anti-corruption agency of China.

Business positions
Preceded by Zheng Zhijie	President of the China Development Bank; 2019－2023	Succeeded by Tan Jiong
