= New Bong Escape Hydropower Project =

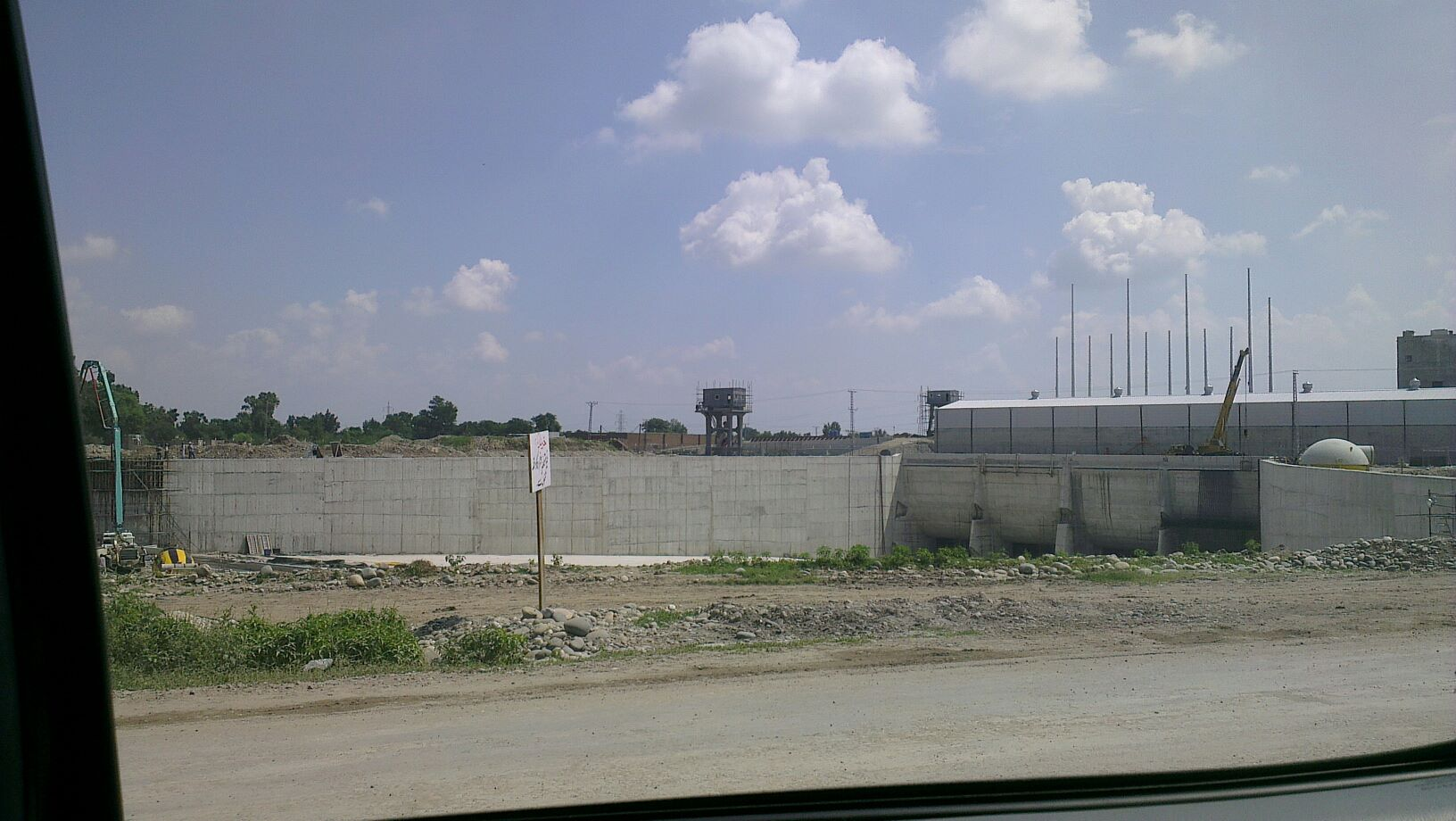
- The complex during final stages of construction

- Location within Pakistan
- Country: Pakistan
- Location: Mangla, Azad Kashmir
- Coordinates: 33.092529°N 73.710046°E
- Status: Operational
- Construction began: 2009
- Opening date: 2013
- Owners: HUBCO; Laraib Group

Dam and spillways
- Type of dam: Run of the river
- Impounds: Jhelum River
- Height: 13 m (43 ft)
- Length: 67 m (220 ft)

Power Station
- Turbines: 4 x 21 MW
- Installed capacity: 84 MW
- Annual generation: 550 GWh

The New Bong Escape Hydropower Project is a privately owned 84 MW run-of-the-river project located on Jhelum River 7.5 km downstream of the 1,070 MW Mangla Dam, a major multi-purpose water storage project commissioned. It is about 120 km from Islamabad, the capital city of Pakistan. The project commenced commercial operations on 23 March, 2013 and has the distinction of being Pakistan and AJ&K’s first hydropower IPP. By developing a bankable framework this trendsetting project has paved the way for rapid and full scale development of Pakistan and AJ&K’s hydropower potential.

The project is jointly owned by HUBCO and Laraib Group with an equity split of 75% and 25% respectively.

The project has been developed under Build-Own-Operate-Transfer (BOOT) basis, whereby it would be transferred to the Government of AJ&K free of cost at the end of a 25-year term.

== Financing and cost ==
The project achieved Financial Closing on December 20, 2009. Total project cost is estimated at about US$235 million and financing is arranged at debt equity ratio of 75 / 25.

USD financing has been provided by Asian Development Bank, Islamic Development Bank, International Finance Corporation, and the French origin Société de Promotion et de Participation pour la Coopération Economique (“PROPARCO”) whereas PKR financing has been provided by Habib Bank Limited (“HBL”) and National Bank of Pakistan (“NBP”).

== Construction ==
The construction of the project started on December 29, 2009 under a fixed price, time certain EPC contract executed with Sambu Construction Company Limited of South Korea (“Sambu”) in June 2009. The water to wire E&M equipment package has been supplied by a leading E&M supplier; Andritz Hydro under a subcontract with Sambu. Hyundai Engineering is the design subcontractor of the EPC Contractor.

Construction of the project was monitored by Owner’s Engineer consisting of joint venture of Montgomery Watson Harza (“MWH”) and National Engineering Services of Pakistan (“NESPAK”) while Mott MacDonald of UK are the Technical Advisors to the Financiers and were responsible for construction and environmental monitoring on their behalf.

== Operation ==
The project achieved commercial operation date on March 23, 2013 which was two months ahead of the required commercial operations date under the PPA.

The operation and maintenance of the project is being carried out by Hub Power Services Limited, a subsidiary of HUBCO.

The project insurances have been placed offshore with leading insurance companies through Marsh, who are the Insurance Advisor and Broker of Record for the Project.

== Distribution ==
The energy generated by the project is purchased by a single buyer, Pakistan’s National Transmission and Dispatch Company Limited (the “NTDC”) under a long term Power Purchase Agreement (the “PPA”). Under the PPA, the hydrological risk is borne by the Power Purchaser through guaranteed payment for fixed costs like debt servicing, O&M, ROE and insurance. A cost plus tariff mechanism is in place under the PPA and the Project has been allowed a reference tariff of PKR 6.8362/KWh (US cents 8.5453/KWh) at Financial Closing which will be adjusted from time to time for certain allowed re-openers indexations as per mechanism given in the PPA.

— Khalid Faizi, Director Laraib Energy

Other Concession Documents package includes the GOP Implementation Agreement with Government of Pakistan, AJ&K Implementation Agreement with AJ&K Entities (i.e. Government of AJ&K and AJ&K Council), Water Use Agreement with Government of AJ&K and Land Lease Agreements with Government of AJ&K.

Under its guarantee (.i.e. the GOP Guarantee), Government of Pakistan has guaranteed the payment obligations of NTDC, Government of Pakistan and Government of AJ&K under the Concession Documents.

== Hydrology and technical details ==
A concrete lined Head-race channel is used to convey the water from Bong Pond to power house. The project does not involve the construction of a dam or reservoir nor does it affect the existing water management regimes. It withdraws water released from the existing Mangla Dam and returns that water to the main stem of the Jhelum River through a 7.5 km long tailrace constructed in a sub-channel of the Jhelum River. The project does not affect upstream or downstream hydrology of the Jhelum River due to its run of the river nature and is having positive environmental and social impacts.

Energy generated through the four 21 MW low head high efficiency Kaplan Bulb turbines, housed in a semi submerged powerhouse complex, is evacuated through an in-out connecting arrangement with the double circuit 132 kVA Mangla/Kharian transmission line, which passes over the Project site. No right-of-way acquisition was needed since connection facility has been built within the Project site.

The project uses the water being discharged from the upstream existing hydropower plant (1,070 MW Mangla Hydroelectric Power Station) located at Mangla Dam. The raising of Mangla Dam has been completed recently by the Pakistan’s Water and Power Development Authority (WAPDA), and will result in increase in the storage capacity of the Mangla Dam (“Mangla Dam Raise Project”). The Mangla Dam Raise Project will provide better regulated water to the Project.

== Noteworthy achievements ==
Pakistan's first Independent Hydropower Plant (IPP), it was awarded Middle East Renewable Deal of the Year 2009 by Euromoney. New Bong Escape was also the first Hydropower Project in Pakistan / AJ&K to be registered as a Clean Development Mechanism (CDM) project by CDM Executive Board under the United Nations Framework Convention on Climate Change on January 31, 2009.

== See also ==
- List of power stations in Pakistan
- List of hydroelectric power stations in Pakistan
- Patrind Hydropower Project
- Gulpur Hydropower Project
- Azad Pattan Hydropower Project
- Mangla Dam
