= Patrind Hydropower Plant =

Hydroelectric power station in Pakistan

Patrind Dam
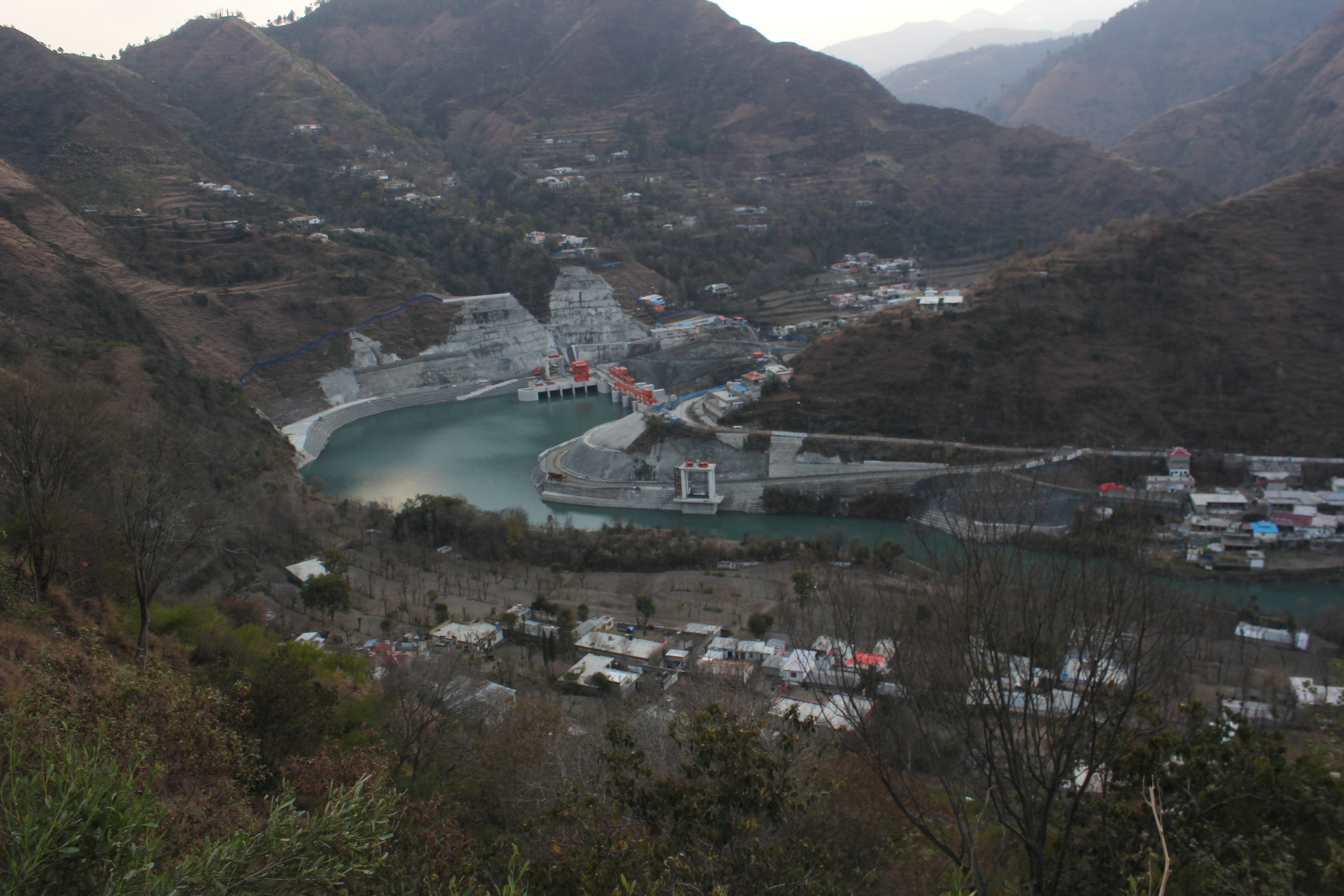

- Location within Pakistan
- Official name: Patrind Dam
- Location: On the border of Abbottabad District of KPK and Muzaffarabad city, of AJK, Pakistan
- Coordinates: 34°20′38.32″N 73°25′43.73″E
- Status: completed
- Construction began: January 2009
- Opening date: November 07, 2017
- Owner: Star Hydro Power Pvt. Limited (SHPL)

Dam and spillways
- Type of dam: Run of the river
- Impounds: Kunhar River
- Height: 26 m (85 ft)
- Length: 114.5 m (376 ft)

Power Station
- Hydraulic head: 110 m (360 ft)
- Turbines: 3 x 50 MW (67,000 hp) Vertical Francis Turbine Units
- Installed capacity: 150 MW (200,000 hp)
- Annual generation: 632.5 GWh (2,277 TJ)

Patrind Hydropower Plant is a run-of-the-river, high head project of 110 metres (360 ft), located on Kunhar River near Patrind Village of Mansehra District, right on the border of Abbottabad District of Khyber Pakhtunkhwa Province and Muzaffarabad city of Azad Kashmir, Pakistan. It is approximately 138 kilometres (86 mi) from Rawalpindi and Islamabad and about 76 kilometres (47 mi) from Abbottabad city.

The dam and the tunnel have been constructed on Kunhar River at Patrind Village in Muzaffarabad District, AJK and Abbottabad District on the right bank in Boi Village and the power house on the right bank of Jhelum River in Muzaffarabad, AJK at lower Chattar near Thuri Park.

== Design and construction ==
The Korean construction company Star Hydro Power Limited (SHPL), an Independent Power Producer (IPP), has set up the 150 megawatts (200,000 hp) Patrind Hydropower Plant, which is the second private hydro power project in Pakistan. Project is being financed by IFC, ADB and K-Exim Bank. The company has completed the project in a period of three-and-a-half years at an estimated cost of $400 million. The project would generate 150 megawatts of electricity which would not only help improve the electricity voltage in Abbottabad and Mansehra districts but also boost economic activities in the region.

Since the project is being developed by SHPL as an IPP, the SHPL has entered into a 30-year Power Purchase Agreement with National Transmission and Dispatch Company (NTDC), Pakistan's grid system operator, for the sale of electricity generated from the Project.

The first independent hydro power project in the private sector – New Bong Escape Hydropower Project of 84MW – has already been completed and started commercial operation in March 2013.

The total electricity generation capacity of the Patrind Hydropower Plant is 150 MW. A surface type powerhouse to accommodate three Vertical Francis Turbine Units, each of 50 MW capacity, is proposed on the right bank of Jehlum River. The powerhouse site is about 8.52 kilometres (5.29 mi) upstream of the Kunhar – Jhelum confluence. The crest elevation is 757 m which is approximately 26m high from the river bed. There will be four radial type crest gates each 13 by 10 metres (43 ft × 33 ft) in size.

== See also ==
- List of dams and reservoirs in Pakistan
- List of power stations in Pakistan
- Khan Khwar Hydropower Project
- Satpara Dam
- Gomal Zam Dam
- Duber Khwar hydropower project
- Kohala Hydropower Project
