= China Government Guidance Fund =

Chinese government investment fund

- Simplified Chinese: 政府引导基金
- Traditional Chinese: 政府引導基金
Transcriptions
Standard Mandarin
- Hanyu Pinyin: Zhèngfǔ Yǐndǎo Jījīn

A China Government Guidance Fund (Guidance Fund) is an investment vehicle set up as a public–private partnership that aims to further industrial policy goals of the People's Republic of China (PRC). It may either invest directly in companies or tangible projects, or invest indirectly by investing in other investment funds (known as sub-funds) through a fund of funds approach. The typical government guidance fund operates as a fund of funds.

== Background ==
In the mid-1990s, the PRC government began promoting industrial investment funds which were the predecessor of guidance funds.

The PRC government set up guidance funds to provide support for entrepreneurship and technological innovation of (but not limited to) startup companies, as well as small and medium-sized enterprises. These funds raise money from both public and private sources and make investments consistent with government priorities such as artificial intelligence, emerging technologies, biomedicine, aerospace, or semiconductors. Most operate as funds of funds. The vast majority of funds are ultimately invested in strategic industries.

Government agencies at central, provincial, and local levels all establish guidance funds. This typically involves creating the fund, setting a fundraising target, financing 20%-30% of the target from the budget provided and raising the rest from other investors whose contributions are called "social capital". While these social capital investors are equated with private capital, they are often state-owned enterprises and public banks. To entice social capital investors, the government sponsor may assume investor losses, forgo interest payments or provide other incentives.

Guidance funds use a limited partnership structure where a general partner makes investment decisions and handles day-to-day operations while the limited partners contribute capital and take returns or losses. The general partner may be either a government-related or a third party investment manager. The Ministry of Finance has encouraged government officials to grant more autonomy to third party managers. The limited partners include the social capital investors.

Each guidance fund has its own investment objectives and restrictions. Some shall invest only in certain sectors or regions. The primary goal of government guidance funds is to attract industrial investment and resources rather than to maximize financial returns. Although it is permissible for government guidance funds to have losses, losses are politically risky for fund managers (who are often government employees).

There are three phases to the development of guidance funds. In the first phase, from the early to mid 2010s, the government set up a number of initial funds as well as the supporting legal framework. In the second phase, there was a boom in guidance funds set up between 2015 and 2018, fueled by factors such as government policies, loose regulation, restrictions on other spending and trend-chasing among government officials. In January 2015, Premier Li Keqiang chaired a meeting to set up national-level government guidance funds. In the third phase, starting around 2018, the pace of forming and fundraising for guidance funds slowed down due mostly to tighter regulations.

=== History ===
In 2002, one of the first guidance funds was launched in Beijing to support startup companies in Zhongguancun.

In 2005, the National Development and Reform Commission (NDRC) formally defined guidance funds and encouraged the establishment of guidance funds to support the development of startup companies through venture capital firms.

In 2008, the State Council set out a policy framework for establishing government guidance funds, describing the purpose of these funds as to "leverage up and amplify the impact of fiscal funds, increase the supply of startup capital, and rectify market failures in the allocation of startup capital". The policy framework also stated that a government guidance fund can operate as fund of funds and that private capital can also be used with government funds to increase the investment in start-ups. The State Council described the basic principles of government guidance funds as "guided by government, operated by market rules, scientific decision making, and risk prevention".

During the general secretaryship of Xi Jinping, the use of government guidance funds has increased.

Guidance funds did not draw much attention until 2014 when the China Integrated Circuit Industry Investment Fund was formed and Made in China 2025 was launched. Government guidance funds have been a significant form of policy support for the goals of Made in China 2025. Local governments' responses to 2014 changes in the Budget Law drove growth of government guidance funds, as local governments increasingly used government guidance funds to develop business after the 2014 changes limited the amount of budget subsidies they could provide to firms.

Beginning in 2015, the Ministry of Finance and the NDRC issued detailed rules for the management of government guidance funds by local governments.

In 2018, the NDRC issued criteria for evaluating government guidance funds, the most important of which was consistency with policy goals.

As of the 2020 Q1, there were 1,741 guidance funds set up with a cumulative target size of 11 trillion RMB. However the funds had raised only 4.76 trillion RMB which was less than half of the target set.

As of 2026, China had deployed government guidance funds to a greater extent to any other country.

== Examples of Guidance Funds ==
Government guidance funds have various goals; some promote specific industries or kinds of infrastructure, others may focus on supporting start-up firms. Central government guidance funds may invest in local government guidance funds.

Government guidance funds include:

- China Integrated Circuit Industry Investment Fund
- The Advanced Manufacturing Industry Investment Fund
- The National Strategic Emerging Industries Investment Guiding Fund
- The Made in China 2025 Strategic Cooperation Fund
- China Internet Investment Fund
- China Reform Holdings Corporation
- National Fund for Technology Transfer and Commercialisation

== See also ==
- Made in China 2025
- Five-year plans of China
- Sovereign funds of China
