= China Development Bank =

Development bank in the People's Republic of China (PRC)

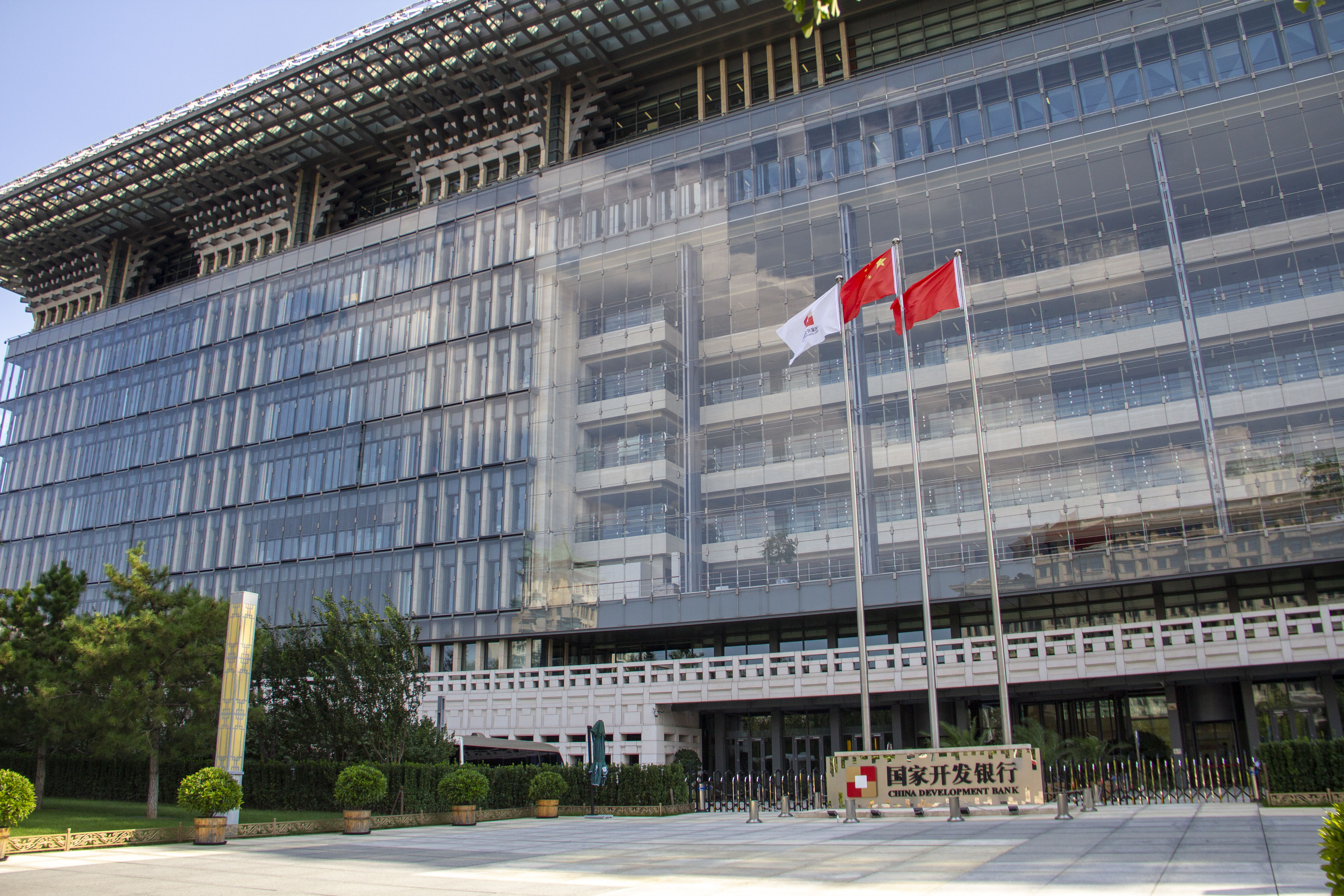
- Head office in Beijing
- Native name: 国家开发银行
- Industry: Development finance
- Founded: 1994; 32 years ago
- Headquarters: Beijing
- Key people: Zhao Huan (chairman)
- Products: Banking
- Revenue: 681,795,000,000 renminbi (2018)
- Owner: Government-owned
- Number of employees: 9,000 (2021)
- Website: www.cdb.com.cn

China Development Bank
- Simplified Chinese: 国家开发银行
- Traditional Chinese: 國家開發銀行
- Literal meaning: National Development Bank
Transcriptions
Standard Mandarin
- Hanyu Pinyin: Guójiā Kāifā Yínháng

China Development Bank (CDB) is a policy bank of China under the State Council. Established in 1994, it has been described as the engine that powers the national government's economic development policies. It has raised funds for numerous large-scale infrastructure projects, including the Three Gorges Dam and the Shanghai Pudong International Airport.

The bank is the second-largest bond issuer in China after the Ministry of Finance. In 2009, it accounted for about a quarter of the country's yuan bonds and is the biggest foreign-currency lender. CDB debt is owned by local banks and treated as a risk-free asset under the proposed People's Republic of China capital adequacy rules (i.e. the same treatment as PRC government bonds).

== Impact ==
CDB provide development-oriented financing for high-priority government projects, particularly major infrastructure and projects that raise quality of life. The main objective as a state financial institution is to support the macroeconomic policies of the central government and to support national economic development and strategic structural changes in the economy. The bank provides financing for national projects such as infrastructure development, basic industries, energy, and transportation.

CDB creates coordinated credit spaces for commercial financiers and firms in China to participate as investors or service providers in areas like construction or logistics on funded projects. This helps de-risk the projects for the commercial involvement.

CDB debt is owned by local banks and treated as a risk-free asset under the proposed People's Republic of China capital adequacy rules (i.e. the same treatment as PRC government bonds).

== History ==
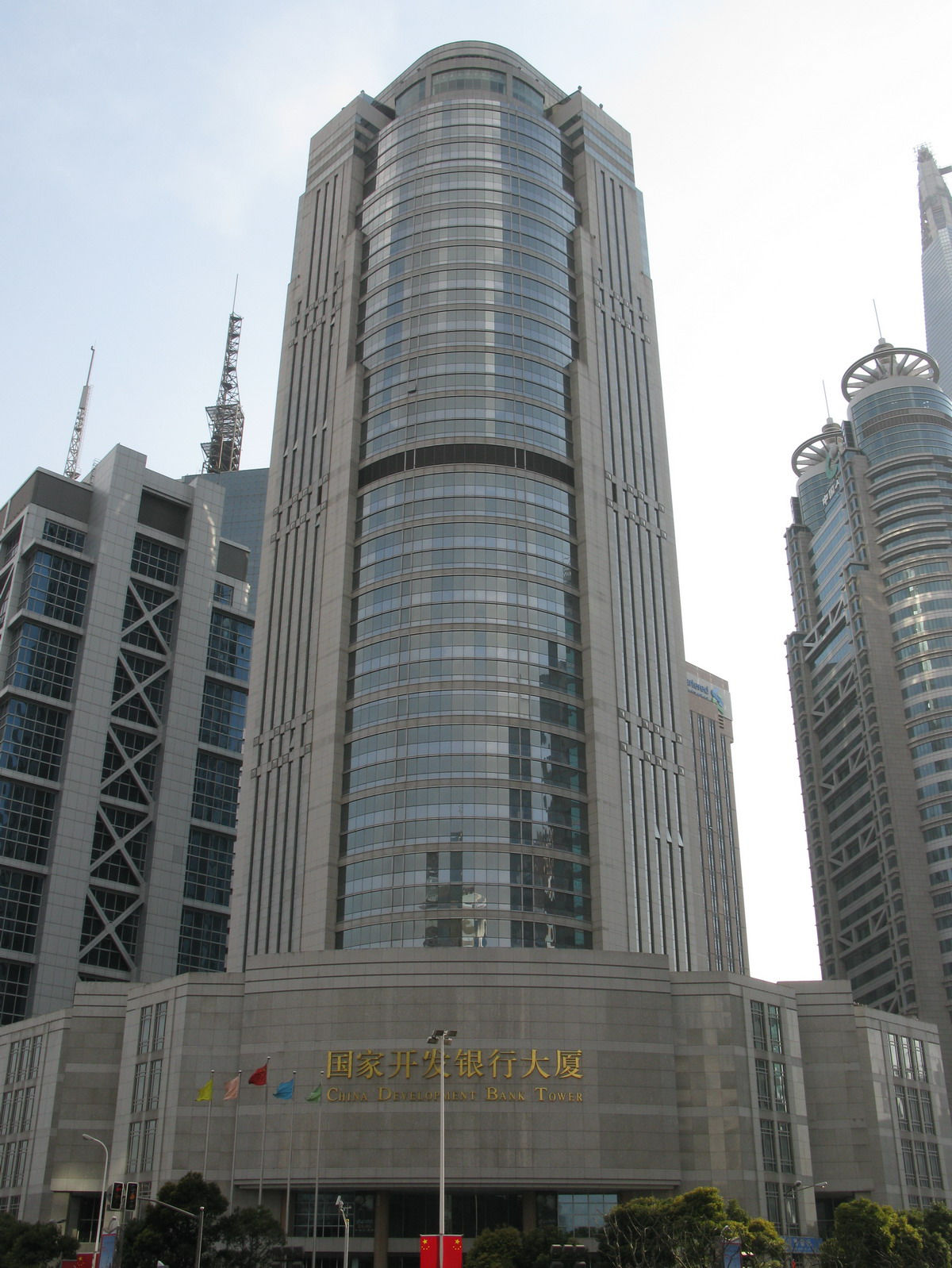
CDB Tower in Shanghai

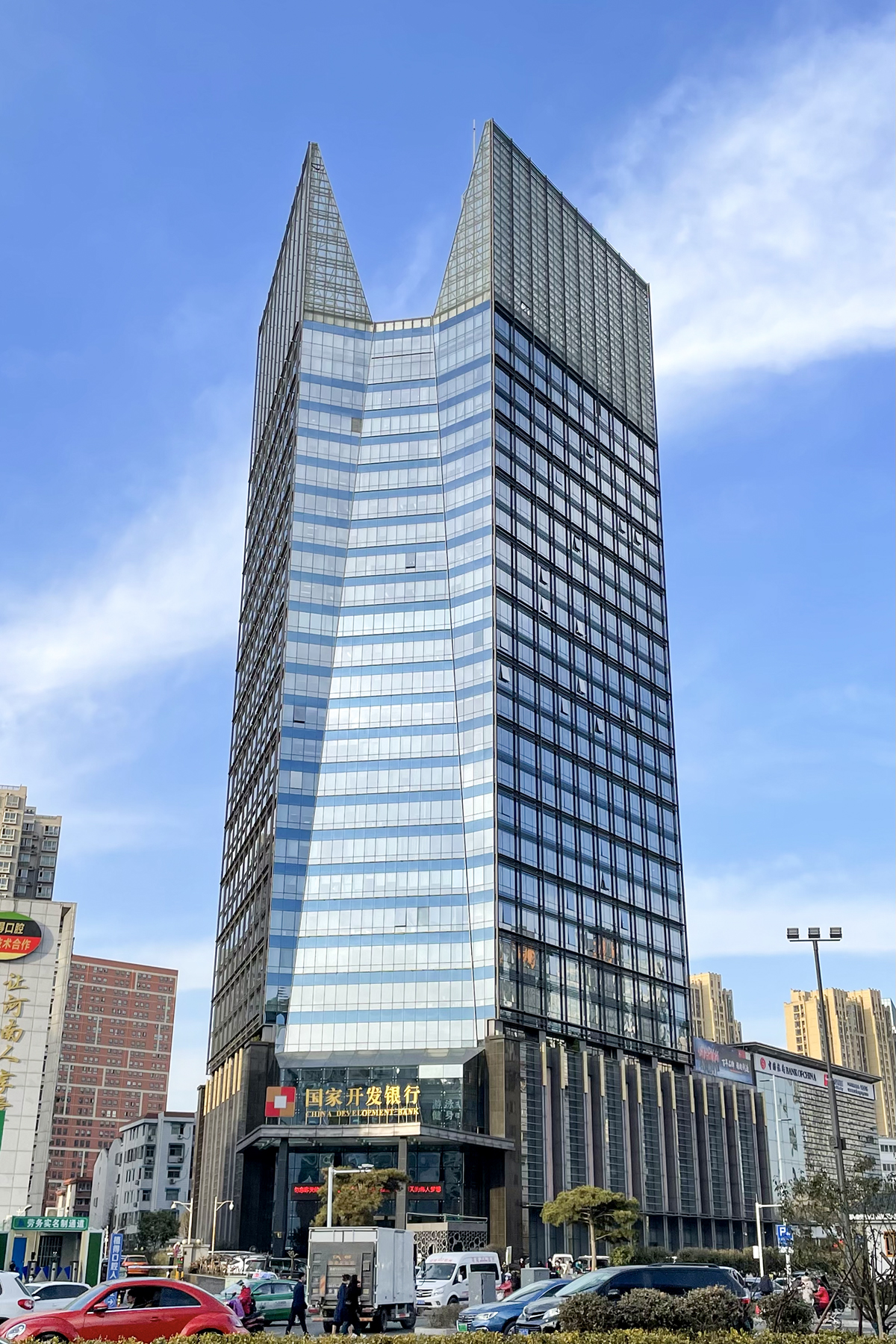
CDB Tower in Zhengzhou

The China Development Bank (CDB) was established in 1994 to provide development-oriented financing for high-priority government projects, particularly major infrastructure and projects that raise quality of life. It is under the direct jurisdiction of the State Council and the People's Central Government. At present, it has 35 branches across the country and one representative office.

The main objective as a state financial institution is to support the macroeconomic policies of the central government and to support national economic development and strategic structural changes in the economy. The bank provides financing for national projects such as infrastructure development, basic industries, energy, and transportation. Most of CDB's loans are for domestic projects, and it began lending for projects abroad in the early 2000s.

From 1994 to 1998, CDB's fundraising was subject to a higher degree of state control than in later periods. In the 1990s, CDB facilitated the creation of China's interbank bond market. Initially, the People's Bank of China (PBOC) required domestic financial institutions such as commercial banks to buy policy bank bonds. At this stage, the PBOC usually set high yields and did not permit the apportioned bonds to be sold on the secondary market. In February 1996, CDB began its first overseas bond issuance in Japan, followed a year later by an issuance in the United States. Overseas issuance helped CDB diversify its funding sources. Ultimately, the issuance of bonds allowed CDB to become a financially independent bank without the state's tax revenues.

In April 1998, former PBOC deputy governor Chen Yuan, the eldest son of Chen Yun, was appointed CDB's governor. Chen implemented reforms designed to increase CDB's autonomy by reducing state involvement in CDB's fundraising and lending.

From 1998 to 2008, CDB increased its fundraising autonomy and used an auction-based bond issuance mechanism to raise its funds. In 1999, CDB offered China's first floating rate bond.

CDB plays a major role in alleviating infrastructure and energy bottlenecks in the Chinese economy. In 2003, CDB made loan arrangements for, or evaluated and underwrote, a total of 460 national debt projects and issued 246.8 billion yuan in loans. This accounted for 41% of its total investment. CDB's loans to the "bottleneck" investments that the government prioritizes amounted to 91% of its total loan count. It also issued a total of 357.5 billion yuan in loans to western areas and more than 174.2 billion yuan to old industrial bases in Northeast China. These loans substantially increased the economic growth and structural readjustments of the Chinese economy.

In 2005 and 2006, CDB issued two pilot asset-backed securities (ABS) products in the domestic Chinese market. Together with other ABS products issued by China Construction Bank, these issuances helped establish a foundation for the development of a debt capital and structured finance market.

China and Venezuela established the China-Venezuela Joint Fund in 2007, with the goal of offering capital funding for infrastructure projects in Venezuela which can be performed by Chinese companies. CDB lent $4 billion to the fund and the Venezuelan Economic and Social Development Bank (BANDES) contributed $2 billion.

As part of China's response to the 2008 financial crisis, emphasis on CDB's policy aspects increased and the state formalized its credit guarantee for CDB. CDB was one of the financial agencies implementing China's stimulus plan and vastly increased its lending for infrastructure and industrial projects.

From 2009 to 2019, CDB has issued 1.6 trillion yuan in loans to more than 4,000 projects involving infrastructure, communications, transportation, and basic industries. The investments are spread along the Yellow River, and both south and north of the Yangtze River. CDB has been increasingly focusing on developing the western and northwestern provinces in China. This could help reduce the growing economic disparity in the western provinces, and it has the potential to revitalize the old industrial bases of northeast China.

In 2010, CDB provided $30 billion in financing to Chinese solar power manufacturers.

At the end of 2010, CDB held US$687.8 billion in loans, more than twice the amount of the World Bank.

After Chen left the governorship of CDB in 2013, the bank's institutional power decreased.

The next CDB governor, Hu Huaibang, removed CDB personnel to staff the bank with personnel loyal to himself. Hu then leveraged his personal influence to approve large amounts of industrial loans which ultimately failed. Hu was removed from office in 2018 on suspicion of corruption and he was sentenced to life in prison in 2021 for accepting bribes to approve projects that should not have passed CDB criteria. Following these events, CDB became significantly more cautious in its financing decisions.

CDB is among the state entities which contribute to the China Integrated Circuit Industry Investment Fund, which was established in an effort to decrease China's reliance on foreign semiconductor companies. The fund was established in 2014.

In 2014, CDB was one of the funders of the Silk Road Fund, along with the State Administration of Foreign Exchange, China Investment Corporation, and Export-Import Bank of China.

In 2015, China used its foreign exchange reserves to recapitalize CDB, which in turn empowered it to make significant foreign loans.

In 2017, CDB provided RMB 130 billion to fund infrastructure and environmental upgrading in Xiong'an.

As of December 2018, outstanding loans to 11 provincial-level regions along the belt amounted to 3.85 trillion yuan (about 575 billion U.S. dollars), according to the CDB. New yuan loans to these regions reached 304.5 billion yuan last year, accounting for 48 percent of the bank's total new yuan loans. The funds mainly went to major projects in the fields of ecological protection and restoration, infrastructure connectivity, and industrial transformation and upgrading. The CDB will continue to support ecological protection and green development of the Yangtze River in 2019, said CDB Chairman Zhao Huan. China issued a development plan for the Yangtze River Economic Belt in September 2016 and a guideline for green development of the belt in 2017. The Yangtze River Economic Belt consists of nine provinces and two municipalities that cover roughly one-fifth of China's land. It has a population of 600 million and generates more than 40 percent of the country's GDP.

As of at least 2018, CDB was the world's largest development bank, with total assets exceeding 16 trillion RMB.

In 2020, China joined the G20-led Debt Service Suspension Initiative, through which official bilateral creditors suspended debt repayments of 73 of the poorest debtor countries. China did not include CDB loans as part of the initiative under the logic that CDB was a commercial lender rather than an official bilateral creditor.

Along with the Silk Road Fund and the Export-Import Bank of China, the China Development Bank is one of the primary financing sources for Belt and Road Initiative projects in Africa, and is an important funder of BRI projects more generally.

== Organizational structure ==
The Governors of the bank report to a Board of Supervisors, who are accountable to the central government. There are four vice governors and two assistant governors. At the end of 2004, CDB had about 3,500 employees. About 1,000 of CDB's employees work at the Beijing Headquarters, with the rest in 35 mainland branches; including a representative office in Tibet and a branch in Hong Kong.

As of 2021, the CDB has more than 9,000 employees.

CDB does not accept deposits from individuals. Its depositors are other financial agencies that are collaborating with CDB or entities which are repaying loans borrowed from CDB.

=== Ownership ===
CDB is wholly state-owned through multiple state bodies. As of 2019, the owners were Central Huijin Investment Ltd. (one of China's sovereign funds), Buttonwood Investment Holding Company Ltd. (owned by the State Administration of Foreign Exchange), and the National Council for Social Security Fund.

=== Subsidiaries and other ventures ===
In 2018, CDB was among the Chinese banks which launched the China-Arab Bank Consortium.

- China Development Bank International Investment

== Leadership ==
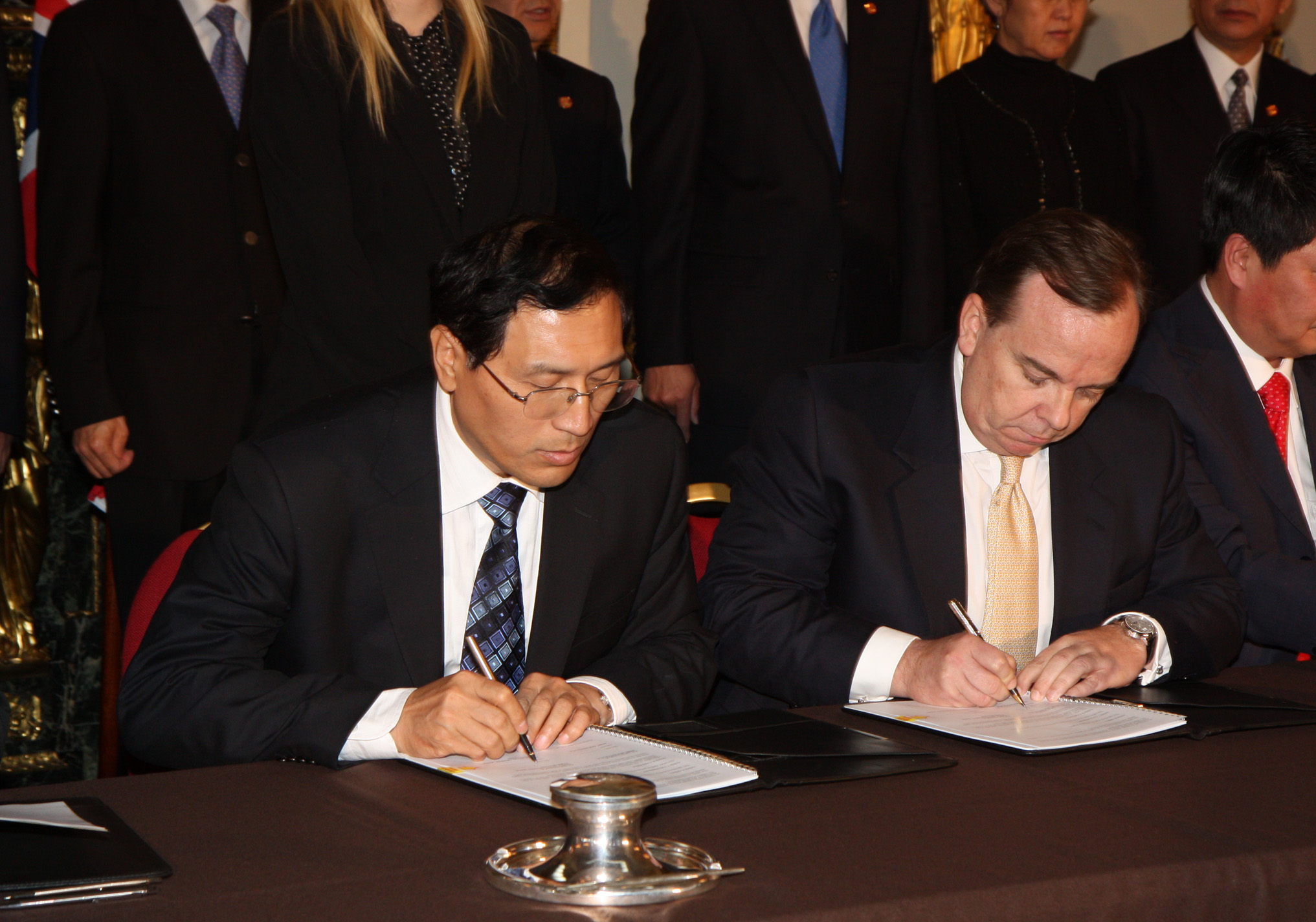
Stuart Gulliver, executive director of HSBC signs a "Memorandum of Understanding" with Zheng Zhijie, Vice Governor of China Development Bank, 10 January 2011.

CDB has a thirteen-member board of directors. Three are the executives in charge of managing CDB. Six are directors from the agencies that hold shares of CDB. The four "government-ministry directors" come from the National Development and Reform Commission, the Ministry of Finance, the Ministry of Commerce, and the People's Bank of China.

=== List of governors ===
Name (English)	Name (Chinese)	Tenure begins	Tenure ends	Note
Yao Zhenyan	姚振炎	March 1994	March 1998	
Chen Yuan	陈元	March 1998	September 2008	
Jiang Chaoliang	蒋超良	September 2008	November 2011	
Zheng Zhijie	郑之杰	October 2012	October 2019	
Ouyang Weimin	欧阳卫民	October 2019	May 2023	
Tan Jiong	谭炯	May 2023		

=== List of chairmen of the board ===
Name (English)	Name (Chinese)	Tenure begins	Tenure ends	Note
Chen Yuan	陈元	September 2008	April 2013	
Hu Huaibang	胡怀邦	April 2013	September 2018	
Zhao Huan	赵欢	September 2018		

== See also ==
- List of national development banks
