= Niu Ximing =

- 牛锡明

Chairman of the Board of the Bank of Communications
- In office May 2013 – February 2018
- Preceded by: Hu Huaibang
- Succeeded by: Peng Chun

President of the Bank of Communications
- In office 29 December 2009 – October 2013
- Preceded by: Li Jun
- Succeeded by: Ren Deqi

Personal details
- Born: August 1956 (age 70) Boye County, Hebei, China
- Party: Chinese Communist Party
- Education: Central University of Finance and Economics; Harbin Institute of Technology

Chinese name
- Simplified Chinese: 牛锡明
- Traditional Chinese: 牛錫明
Transcriptions
Standard Mandarin
- Hanyu Pinyin: Niú Xīmíng

Niu Ximing (Chinese: 牛锡明; born August 1956) is a Chinese politician who served as president of the Bank of Communications from 2009 to 2013. He was a delegate to the 19th National Congress of the Chinese Communist Party.

== Early life and education ==
Niu was born in Boye County, Hebei in August 1956. He graduated from the Finance Department, Central University of Finance and Economics in 1983 with a bachelor's degree and earned a master's degree in Technical Economics from the School of Management, Harbin Institute of Technology in 1997.

== Career ==
From September 1983 to July 1986, Niu worked at the People's Bank of China, serving as deputy director of the Industrial and Commercial Credit Department at its Qinghai Provincial Branch from December 1984.

From July 1986 to December 2009, Niu worked at the Industrial and Commercial Bank of China (ICBC), where he held various positions including deputy general manager and general manager of the Xining Branch in Qinghai; deputy director, director, and general manager of the Industrial and Commercial Credit Department; general manager of the Beijing Branch; assistant president and general manager, and later vice president and executive director of the Beijing Branch. In 1999, he was awarded the special government allowance by the State Council.

From December 2009 to February 2018, Niu served at the Bank of Communications, first as vice chairman, executive director, and president until May 2013, then as chairman, executive director, and president until October 2013, and finally as party secretary, chairman, and executive director.

Business positions
Preceded by Li Jun	President of the Bank of Communications; 2009–2013	Succeeded by Ren Deqi
Preceded by Hu Huaibang	Chairman of the Board of the Bank of Communications; 2013–2018	Succeeded by Peng Chun
