= Green finance and the Belt and Road Initiative =

Global economic development initiative in China

Green finance is officially promoted as an important feature of the Belt and Road Initiative, China's signature global economic development initiative. The official vision for the BRI calls for an environmentally friendly "Green Belt and Road".

== Policy ==
Chinese policy documents for the BRI coordinate and encourage green finance and investment.

The Ministry of Ecology and Environment with four other ministries released the "Guidance on Promoting a Green Belt and Road" in 2017. A section of the policy document covers mobilizing capital for financing green projects using "international multilateral and bilateral cooperative institutions and funds, such as Silk Road Fund, South-South Cooperation Assistance Fund, China-ASEAN Investment Cooperation Fund, China-Central and Eastern Europe Investment Cooperation Fund, China-ASEAN Maritime Cooperation Fund, Special Fund for Asian Regional Cooperation and LMC Special Fund." Policy institutions like the China Development Bank and Export-Import Bank of China are to play the "guiding role".

The Development Research Center of the State Council and Export-Import Bank of China released a report in 2019 on green finance for the Belt and Road. The report gives recommendations and draws on lessons for China to develop Belt and Road green finance and goes into the details about "implementing the concept of green finance" by Export-Import Bank.

== Forms ==
The various forms of green finance includes investments, lending, and insurance by Chinese state-owned financial entities and companies for renewable energy projects in host countries of the Belt and Road.

=== Bonds ===
The market for green bonds in China is the second largest in the world. In the international bond market, Chinese banks have also issued green bonds. China Development Bank in November 2017 issued the first green bond specifically for Belt and Road projects. This first green BRI bond had EUR and USD tranches of US$1.1 billion for "renewable energy, clean transportation and water resource management projects" in BRI countries. In the same month, the Bank of China issued a green bond on the London Stock Exchange although not specifically for projects in the BRI.

=== Loans ===
The two primary Chinese policy banks for financing BRI projects are China Development Bank and Export Import Bank and each states support for advancing more green loans. Both banks consider green loans to mean financing projects in renewable energy or environmental protection. The Export Import Bank claimed to fulfill green obligations under the Belt and Road by supporting "a large number of projects featuring low energy consumption and high value added in areas of new energy development and utilization and the circular economy." However, out of the energy project loans advanced by both banks between 2014 and 2017 for the BRI, 18% went to coal while solar and wind accounted for 3.4% and 2.9% respectively.

== Coal projects ==
The primary contradiction with adherence to green finance and BRI projects is the large amount of lending by Chinese banks for coal fired power plants. In contrast, Western financial institutions have limited or prohibited financing of coal fired power plants starting with the World Bank and European Investment Bank in 2013. State owned Chinese commercial banks have shown a willingness to limit coal projects. In 2017, ICBC and China Construction Bank decided to not fund the Carmichael coal mine after environmental protests by the Australian public.

In 2021, the International Institute of Green Finance reported that China didn't finance any coal projects via its Belt and Road Initiative in the first half of 2021, which is a first since 2013 when BRI was launched.
