= Ren Deqi =

- 任德奇

Chairman of the Board of the Bank of Communications
- In office January 2020 – 27 June 2025
- Preceded by: Peng Chun

President of the Bank of Communications
- In office August 2018 – January 2020
- Preceded by: Niu Ximing
- Succeeded by: Liu Jun

Personal details
- Born: 1963 (age 62–63) Hunan, China
- Party: Chinese Communist Party
- Education: Tsinghua University

Ren Deqi (Chinese: 任德奇; pinyin: Rén Déqí; born 1963) is a Chinese banker and business executive who served as chairman and executive director of Bank of Communications Co., Ltd. (BOCOMM), one of China's largest commercial banks, from 2020 to 2025. He is also chairman of the Shanghai Financial Industry Association. He is a member of the 14th National Committee of the Chinese People's Political Consultative Conference. He is a representative of the 20th National Congress of the Chinese Communist Party.

== Early life and education ==
Born in 1963 in Hunan, Ren graduated from Tsinghua University with a master of engineering degree in 1988.

== Career ==
Ren began his career in 1988 and held various positions in China Construction Bank (CBC)'s credit management and risk control departments. Between 2003 and 2014, he served as: deputy general manager of Credit Approval Department, general manager of Risk Monitoring Department, general manager of Credit Management Department, president of Hubei Provincial Branch, and general manager of Risk Management Department.

In July 2014, Ren was appointed vice president of Bank of China (BOC). He later was chosen as an executive director in December 2016. During his tenure, he also held additional roles, including: non-executive director of Bank of China (Hong Kong) Limited (2015–2018) and head of BOC's Shanghai RMB Trading Business Headquarters (2016–2018).

In June 2018, Ren joined the Bank of Communications as deputy party secretary. Two months later, he became vice chairman, executive director, and president (CEO) of the bank. He was promoted to party secretary, the top political position in the bank, in December 2019. In January 2020, he was made chairman of the board, succeeding Peng Chun.

Business positions
Preceded by Niu Ximing	President of the Bank of Communications; 2018–2020	Succeeded by Liu Jun
Preceded by Peng Chun	Chairman of the Board of the Bank of Communications; 2020–2025	Succeeded by TBA
