= Hou Weidong =

- 侯维栋

Vice President of Bank of Communications
- In office December 2010 – April 2020
- President: Niu Ximing; Ren Deqi; Peng Chun

Personal details
- Born: January 1960 (age 66) Zibo, Shandong, China
- Party: Chinese Communist Party
- Education: Peking University

Chinese name
- Simplified Chinese: 侯维栋
- Traditional Chinese: 侯維棟
Transcriptions
Standard Mandarin
- Hanyu Pinyin: Hóu Wèidōng

Hou Weidong (Chinese: 侯维栋; born January 1960) is a Chinese banker and academic who served as vice president of Bank of Communications from 2010 to 2020. He has been retired for 5 years. As of October 2025 he was under investigation by China's top anti-graft watchdog.

== Early life and education ==
Hou was born in Zibo, Shandong, in January 1960. He earned a Ph.D. in Economics from Peking University in 2003.

== Career ==
He began his career in 1982 at the Qingdao Branch of the People's Bank of China and later at the Qingdao Branch of the Industrial and Commercial Bank of China (ICBC). During his tenure at ICBC Qingdao Branch, he held several key positions, including deputy director of the Computer Department, deputy head of the Science and Technology Division, chief engineer of the branch, and concurrently served as president of the Qingdao Economic Development Zone Sub-branch. He joined the Chinese Communist Party (CCP) in January 1986. From November 1998 to April 2002, he served successively as deputy general manager of the Technical Support Department and general manager of the Data Center at ICBC headquarters. In April 2002, he was appointed deputy general manager of the Bank's Computer Department, a position he held until November of the same year.

In August 2004, he joined the Bank of Communications (BoCom) as its chief information officer (CIO). He was promoted to vice president of BoCom in December 2010, while continuing to serve as CIO until January 2017. From 2014, he concurrently held the position of chairman of BoCom Life Insurance Co., Ltd. until his departure from this role in 2018. He was appointed an executive director of BoCom in October 2015. In April 2020, he retired from Bank of Communications, resigning from his positions as executive director, vice president, member of the Board Strategy Committee (Inclusive Finance Development Committee), and the bank's authorized representative.

Since retiring from executive roles, Hou transitioned to academia. In April 2021, he was appointed a distinguished professor at JNanjing Audit University, and honorary dean of the Institute of Green Finance and Sustainable Development. He also served as an adjunct professor and Master's Thesis Supervisor at the PBC School of Finance, Tsinghua University.

== Investigation ==
On 28 October 2025, Hou was put under investigation for alleged "serious violations of discipline and laws" by the Central Commission for Discipline Inspection (CCDI), the party's internal disciplinary body, and the National Supervisory Commission, the highest anti-corruption agency of China.
