= Li Jiping =

Chinese banker (born 1955)

- 李吉平

Vice Governor of the China Development Bank
- In office September 2008 – January 2016
- Chairman: Hu Huaibang

Personal details
- Born: September 1955 (age 71) Dalian, Liaoning, China
- Party: Chinese Communist Party (expelled in 2024)
- Education: Dongbei University of Finance and Economics, Central Party School of the Chinese Communist Party

Li Jiping (Chinese: 李吉平; pinyin: Lǐ Jípíng; born September 1955) is a former Chinese banker who served as vice governor of the China Development Bank between 2008 and 2016 when he retired. He was expelled from the Chinese Communist Party in 2024.

== Early life and education ==
Li was born in Dalian, Liaoning, in September 1955. After resuming the college entrance examination, in 1979, he enrolled at Liaoning College of Finance and Economics (now Dongbei University of Finance and Economics), where he majored in infrastructure finance and credit.

== Career ==
After college in 1983, he was assigned to the China Construction Bank, working in the bank for more than 11 years.

He was appointed deputy director of the Office of the China Development Bank and deputy director of the Policy Research Office in 1994, becoming governor of the Sichuan Branch in 2004 and dean and deputy director of the Personnel Bureau in 2006. In September 2008, he rose to become vice governor of the China Development Bank, a post he kept until January 2016.

== Downfall ==
On 13 March 2024, Li has been placed under investigation for "serious violations of laws and regulations" by the Central Commission for Discipline Inspection (CCDI), the party's internal disciplinary body, and the National Supervisory Commission, the highest anti-corruption agency of China. His colleagues Zhou Qingyu and Wang Yongsheng, both were vice governors of the China Development Bank, had been disgraced in 2023. His superior Hu Huaibang was sacked for graft in 2019. On 1 August 2024, he was expelled from the Chinese Communist Party.
