= Caida =

Caida (财大; lit. 'University of finance') is a Chinese abbreviation that may refer to:

- Central University of Finance and Economics, a national public university in Beijing
- Shanghai University of Finance and Economics, a national public university in Shanghai
- Southwestern University of Finance and Economics, a national public university in Chengdu, Sichuan
