= Liu Jun (banker) =

- 刘珺

Governor of Industrial and Commercial Bank of China
- Incumbent
- Assumed office 22 May 2024
- Preceded by: Gu Shu

Governor of the Bank of Communications
- In office July 2020 – 14 May 2024
- Preceded by: Peng Chun
- Succeeded by: Zhang Baojiang

Personal details
- Born: 1972 (age 53–54) Tongwei County, Gansu, China
- Party: Chinese Communist Party
- Education: Northeastern State University; Hong Kong Polytechnic University
- Occupation: Banker, politician

Chinese name
- Simplified Chinese: 刘珺
- Traditional Chinese: 劉珺
Transcriptions
Standard Mandarin
- Hanyu Pinyin: Liú Jùn

Liu Jun (Chinese: 刘珺; born 1972) is a Chinese banker and politician who served as governor of Industrial and Commercial Bank of China and chief supervisor of the China National Association of Financial Market Institutional Investors (NAFMII).

He is a member of the 20th Central Committee of the Chinese Communist Party.

== Early life and education ==
Liu was born in Tongwei County, Gansu, in 1972. He graduated from the Northeastern State University with an MBA in 1996 before gaining his DBA from Hong Kong Polytechnic University in 2003.

== Career ==
Starting in July 1993, Liu served in several posts in the China Everbright Bank, including trader, deputy head and then head of the Agency Branch of International Business Department, chief representative of Hong Kong Representative Office, general manager of Capital Department, general manager of Investment Banking Department, general manager of Financial Market Center, assistant governor, vice governor, and governor of Shanghai Branch.

Liu was deputy general manager of China Everbright (Group) Corporation in July 2014 and subsequently deputy general manager of China Investment Corporation in October 2016.

Liu was deputy party secretary of the Bank of Communications in May 2020, in addition to serving as governor two months later. He also serves as chief supervisor of the China National Association of Financial Market Institutional Investors since December 2021. On 14 May 2024, he resigned from his position as governor of the Bank of Communications due to job adjustments. Later he was appointed as the governor of Industrial and Commercial Bank of China.

On 29 October 2026, at the fifth plenary session of the 20th CCP Central Committee, he was elected as a member of the Central Committee.

Business positions
| Preceded by Peng Chun | Governor of the Bank of Communications; 2020–2024 | Succeeded by Zhang Baojiang |
| Preceded by Gu Shu | Governor of Industrial and Commercial Bank of China; 2024– | Incumbent |
