= Bank of Communications (Hong Kong) =

Bank of Hong Kong, China

The Bank of Communications (Hong Kong) Limited (Chinese: 交通銀行(香港)有限公司) is a licensed bank in Hong Kong. It was opened in 1934 and incorporated in 2018.

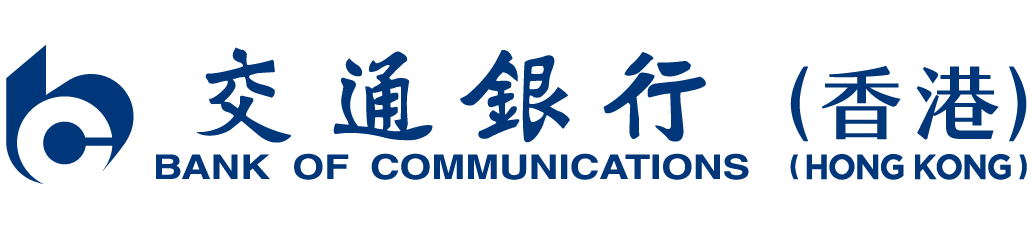
Bank of Communications (Hong Kong) Logo

The Bank's Hong Kong Branch was consolidated as part of "Joint Office of Joint Public-Private Banks" in 1952, and later part of the Bank of China Group. On 14 April 1998, the Hong Kong Branch seceded from the Bank of China Group, and its Head Office resumed its full management. In December 1998, the Bank purchased the new Bank of Communications Tower and has since commenced centralized operations in Hong Kong. Bank of Communications Trustee Limited was also approved by the Mandatory Provident Fund Schemes Authority as one of the 21 authorized MPF trustees. In November 1999, it was selected by the financial consultants of the HKSAR government, amongst HSBC, Bank of China (Hong Kong), Standard Chartered, Hang Seng Bank, as one of the 5 receiving banks of the Tracker Fund of Hong Kong. On 23 June 2005, Bank of Communications was listed in Hong Kong, the first China based commercial bank of its kind to get listed outside mainland China. It now has securities, insurance and trustee businesses.

Bank of Communications founded Bank of Communications (Hong Kong) in 2017. The personal banking and private banking services of the Bank's Hong Kong Branch transferred to the Bank of Communications (Hong Kong).

== Subsidiaries ==
- China Communications Insurance Co., Ltd.
- BCOM Securities Company Limited

== See also ==
- List of banks in Hong Kong
