= Central University of Finance and Economics =

Public university in Beijing, China

Coordinates: 39.959°N 116.341°E

- 中央财经大学
- Other names: Zhongcai (中财); Yangcai (央财); Cai Da (财大)
- Motto: 忠诚 团结 求实 创新
- Motto in English: Loyalty, Unity, Truth, Innovation
- Type: National university
- Established: 1949; 77 years ago
- President: Ma, Haitao
- Faculty: 1,067
- Students: 15,117
- Undergraduates: 10,101
- Postgraduates: 4,342
- Doctoral students: 673
- Location: Beijing, China
- Mascot: "Dragon-horse holding up the universe" (Symbol – also forms part of the logo)
- Website: cufe.edu.cn

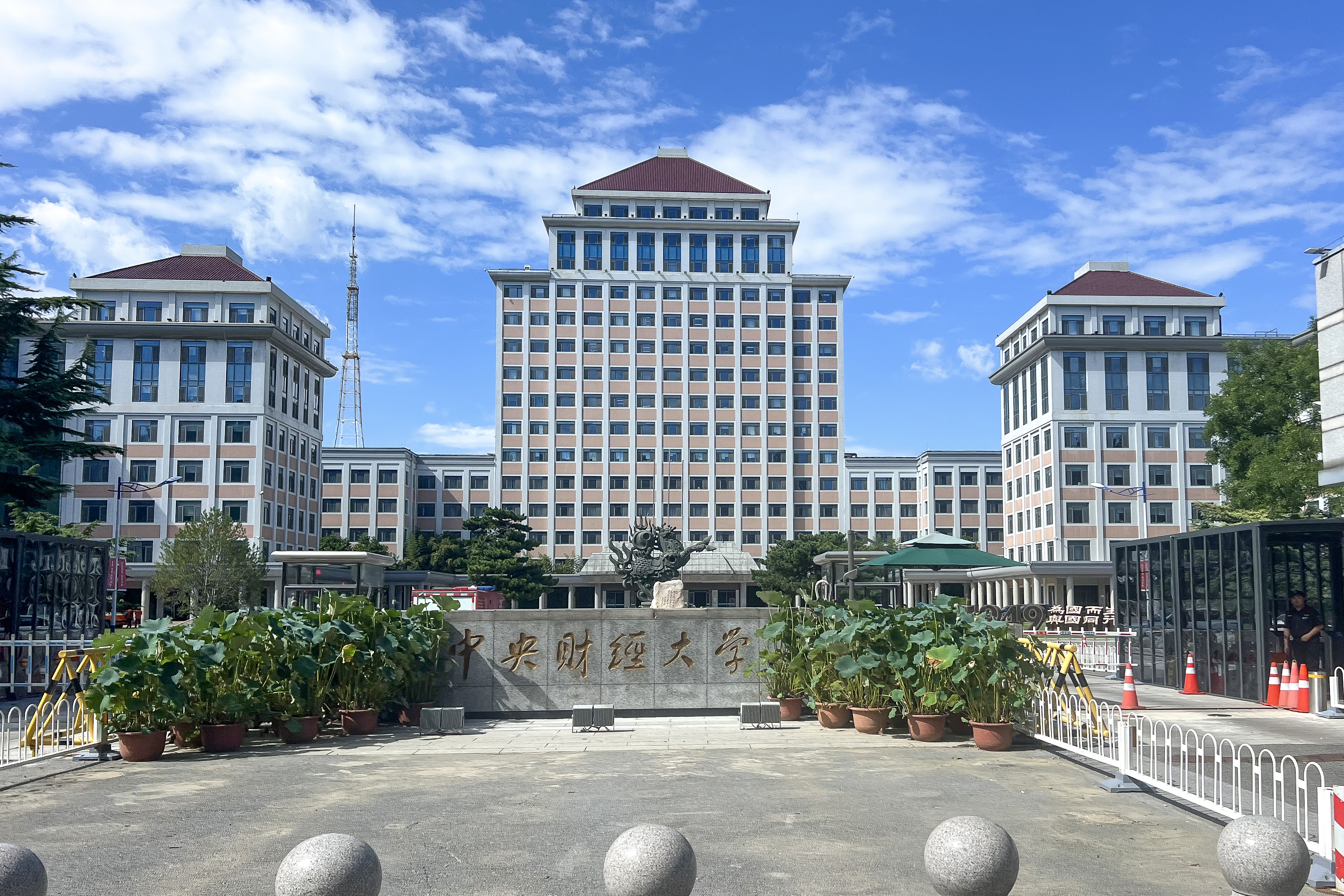
Main campus

The Central University of Finance and Economics (CUFE) is a public finance and economics university located in Beijing, China. Affiliated with the Ministry of Education of China, the university is co-sponsored by the Ministry of Education, the Ministry of Finance, and the Beijing Municipal People's Government. The university is part of the Double First-Class Construction and Project 211.

CUFE is the first economics and management university which was founded by the China Central Government. The university emphasizes the disciplines of economics, management, law, literature, philosophy, science, engineering, pedagogy and art.

== History ==
In 1949, shortly after the founding of the People's Republic of China, CUFE (then called Central School of Taxation), the first university of finance and economics in the Republic, was created by the China Central Government.

In 1952, the faculties and staffs of economics of Peking University, Tsinghua University, Yenching University, and Fu Jen Catholic University are merged into CUFE.

Formerly known as Central School of Taxation, it went through several stages of development, from Central Institute of Finance, Central Institute of Finance and Economics, to Central Institute of Finance and Banking. In 1996, the institute was officially renamed as Central University of Finance and Economics (CUFE) under the direct leadership of the Ministry of Education. CUFE upholds "loyalty, unity, truth and innovation" as its motto, adhering to the philosophy of "pursuing truth and excellence". With over 125,000 graduates, CUFE is known as "the Cradle of Giants in the Field of Finance and Management".

In 1999, the Communist Party former general secretary, Jiang Zemin, gave CUFE his autograph to celebrate the 50th birthday of the university.

== Key disciplinary areas ==
World-class Discipline honored by the Ministry of Education: Applied Economics, which includes National Economics, Regional Economics, Public Finance, Finance, Industrial Economics, International Trade, Labor Economics, Statistics, Quantitative Economics, Defense Economics, Governmental Economics and Management, Investment, Media Economics, Insurance, Actuarial Science, Security Investment, International Finance, Financial Engineering, Taxation.

National Key Disciplines honored by the Ministry of Education: Applied Economics, National Economics, Regional Economics, Public Finance, Finance, Industrial Economics, International Trade, Labor Economics, Statistics, Quantitative Economics, Defense Economics, Accounting.

Municipal Key Disciplines honored by the Beijing Government: Business Administration, Statistics, Political Economics, World Economics, Chinese Marxism, Economic Information Management, Management of Multinational Company

Key Research Base of the Ministry of Education: China Institute of Actuarial Science

== Organization ==
Central University of Finance and Economics has four campuses in Beijing (Civil Campus, Shahe Campus, Qinghe Campus and Xishan Campus) and operates 38 correspondence centers in 18 provinces, municipalities and autonomous regions across China. The schools, centers, institutes and academies of CUFE are listed below.

=== Schools ===
- School of Public Finance and Tax
- School of Finance
- School of Accountancy
- School of Insurance
- School of Statistics and Mathematics
- School of International Trade and Economics
- School of Economics
- Business School
- School of Management Science and Engineering
- School of Government
- School of Sport Economics and Management
- Law School
- School of Sociology and Psychology
- School of Marxism
- School of Culture and Communication
- School of Foreign Studies
- School of Information

=== Institutes ===
- Institute for Finance and Economics Research
- Institute of Defense Economics and Management
- International Institute of Green Finance

=== Centers ===
- Center for China Fiscal Development
- China Center for Human Capital and Labor Market Research

=== Academies ===
- China Economics and Management Academy
- Chinese Academy of Finance and Development
- China Academy of Public Finance and Public Policy

== Faculty and staff ==
As of September 2017, Central University of Finance and Economics has 1,759 faculty and staff (1178 full-time teachers). Among full-time teachers, there are 293 professors, 451 associate professors and 434 assistant professors and lecturers. In the recent three years (2015–2017), the newly hired faculty members of CUFE are mainly graduated from world-renowned universities.

== Students ==
In 2026, the university has approximately 10,000 undergraduates, 6,100 masters, and 400 international students.

CUFE has trained more than 125,000 experts in economics and management who have made, and continue to make, significant contributions to the development of China. Many CUFE alumni hold key positions in government, such as the vice premier of the Central Government, the minister of finance, the central bank governor. In the recent three years (2015–2017), more than 50% of the undergraduate students of CUFE will pursuit a master's or doctoral degree after graduation.

== Rankings and reputation ==
Central University of Finance and Economics has been regarded as the best university in finance, economics, business and management of China, which is known as "the Cradle of Giants in the Fields of Finance and Management". In The Report of Chinese Universities and Courses evaluation of 2017–2018 (released by Research Center for China Science Evaluation), Central University of Finance and Economics was ranked No.1 among 67 finance and economics universities in mainland China. According to 2018 China College Rankings By Salary, the average salaries of CUFE graduates is ranked No.9 in China. In the Assessments of Ministry of Education, the Applied Economics of CUFE is ranked as No. 1 in China, tired with the Peking University and the Renmin University of China.

As of 2022, Central University of Finance and Economics ranked the best in Beijing and 2nd nationwide among universities specialized in finance, business, and economics in the recognized Best Chinese Universities Ranking. CUFE ranks in the global top # 33 in "Finance", top # 101 in "Economics", top # 301 in "Business Administration", top # 301 in "Political Science", and top # 301 in "Management" by the Academic Ranking of World Universities (ARWU) by Subjects. As of 2024, the U.S. News & World Report Best Global University Ranking ranked CUFE at #108 globally and 24th in Asia in "Economics and Business" subject.

== Notable alumni ==
Name	Position
Tian Jiyun	Vice Premier of the Central Government
Wang Bingqian	Minister of Finance, State Councilor, Vice Chairman of the National People's Congress
Wang Guangying	Vice Chairman of the National People's Congress
Li Jinhua	Vice Chairman of the Chinese People's Political Consultative Conference, Auditor-General of the State Audit Commission
Jin Renqing	Minister of Finance, Director-General of the State Administration of Taxation
Rong Zihe	Minister of Finance
Li Yuang	Director-General of the State Administration of Taxation
Dai Xianglong	Central Bank Governor
Fan Busheng	CPC Secretary of the Central Bank
Niu Ximing	Chairman of the Board of the Bank of Communications
Tao Liming	President of the Postal Savings Bank of China
Duan Xiaoxing	President of the Hua Xia Bank
Shi Jiliang	President of the Agricultural Bank of China
Wang Deyan	Chairman of the Board and President of the Bank of China
Zhang Youjun	Chairman of the Board of the CITICS Securities, chairman of the board of the China Securities
Jin Jiandong	President of the Guotai Securities
Shao Chun	Chairman of the Board of the China Securities, the Founder of the Chinese Aircraft Carrier
Dai Fengju	President of the China Reinsurance Company
Wang Guangqian	President of the Central University of Finance and Economics
Wang Yaoqi	President of the Central University of Finance and Economics
Wang Kejing	President of the Central University of Finance and Economics
Gao Yibin	President of the National Accounting Institute, Beijing
Hao Shuchen	CPC Secretary of the Shandong University of Finance and Economics
Chen Daisun	Economist, Professor of the Peking University
Cui Jingbo	Professor of the Yenching University, the Peking University, the China-France University, the China University
Sun Zhiqiang	Vice Minister of the General Logistics Department of the People's Liberation Army of China
Li Fei	Founder of TF Entertainment

== International cooperation ==
As of 2017, Central University of Finance and Economics has cooperation with 126 universities, governments, international organizations and companies abroad.

Started in 2006, asked to help the China's Central Government, CUFE has trained thousands of senior administration officials from 91 developing countries.

CUFE has cooperation with many universities all over the world, such as University of Waterloo, University of Birmingham, Tilburg University, Stevens Institute of Technology, Victoria University, Academy of Finance of the Russian Federation, St. Petersburg State Economic University, Ukraine Kyiv National University of Economics, Chung-Ang University, Tunghai University, Ming Chuan University, Kyungnam University, Soochow University, University of Pernambuco.

CUFE has cooperation with international organizations as well, such as the Institute and Faculty of Actuaries (IFoA), the Chartered Insurance Institute, the Australian and New Zealand Institute of Insurance and Finance.

CUFE also has many cooperations with some international companies, such as Zurich Financial Services Group, AXA, National Union Life and Limb Insurance Company.

In 2013, CUFE has launched a Confucius Institute in the University of Pernambuco, Brazil.

== Courses ==
Public Computer Courses for Undergraduates
Arrangement	Course Title	Credits	Main Teaching Objectives	Study Preparation
Arrangement 1: Basic computer courses	Fundamentals of Computer Application	2	This course is a basic course of university computer. Its main teaching objectives are to popularize the basic knowledge of computing, cultivate professional application skills and train computing thinking ability, and strive to improve the information literacy and comprehensive application ability of non computing college students.	nothing
Arrangement 1: Basic computer courses	Database Principle and Applications	2	This paper introduces the concepts of database system and relational database, as well as the methods of database design in detail, and systematically explains the design of database table, visual query design, structured query language SQL, form design, VBA programming, report design and web page design with access as the operation platform. Through the study of this course, students can not only understand the basic contents of database principle and the methods and steps of database design, but also systematically master the basic operation methods of database and the design methods of database management system, so as to lay a good database application foundation for students' work and study in the future.	Students are required to have a basic knowledge of computer operation
Arrangement 1: Basic computer courses	Excel Advanced Application	2	The course takes the needs of economics and management as the main goal, focusing on the application level. Through the application of management cases, modeling and spreadsheet, students can understand the powerful comprehensive data management and analysis ability of Excel, master the basic application of Excel in economic management, help students master the use of Excel tools to solve practical problems and improve students' ability to solve problems, Lay a solid foundation for future work.	Students are required to have a basic knowledge of computer operation
Arrangement 2: Programming courses	C Programming	2	Fully master the syntax basis and basic program control structure of C language, and master the use method of basic data types of C language; Focus on mastering the basic ideas and methods of programming, and understand the concept of process oriented programming; Learn the basic methods and skills of programming, and be able to use the knowledge to solve practical problems.	Students are required to have a basic knowledge of computer operation
Arrangement 2: Programming courses	C++ for Programming	3	This course is an introductory course of high-level language programming. The goal is to enable students to gradually master the object-oriented function of C + + in the learning process, so as to master the basic knowledge and skills of object-oriented programming, and lay a solid programming foundation for subsequent course learning.	Students are required to have a basic knowledge of computer operation
Arrangement 2: Programming courses	Java Programming Design(Bilingual)	3	The course objective is to comprehensively master the syntax basis and basic program control structure of Java, and master the use method of java basic class library; Focus on mastering java object-oriented programming ideas, and understand the implementation of encapsulation, inheritance, polymorphism and other technologies; Master Java's advanced applications such as exception handling, object serialization, generics, iterators, text file I / O, binary file I / O and graphical interface, and be able to develop desktop applications.	Students are required to have a basic knowledge of computer operation
Arrangement 2: Programming courses	Python Programming	2	The goal of the course is to enable non computer majors to quickly master programming concepts and basic programming knowledge, be able to write correctly running programs using python, form good programming habits, and lay a foundation for in-depth study of Python advanced technologies (such as data analysis, data acquisition, etc.). It can be used as an introductory course for students' programming language courses in various colleges. If the college involves teaching contents of data analysis, data management, data visualization and other related majors, students can be recommended to take it.	nothing
Arrangement 2: Programming courses	Web Front-end Design and Development	2	The goal of the course is to let students understand the working principle of the web, understand some core concepts in the web, and be able to realize a simple web site, so as to lay a solid foundation for building complex web applications.	nothing
Arrangement 3: Computer frontier technology courses	Introduction of Artificial Intelligence	2	Artificial intelligence is one of the most rapidly developing disciplines in recent years. It not only promotes the further development and reform of information technology, but also has a far-reaching impact on other traditional industries, such as manufacturing, finance, medical treatment and so on. Artificial intelligence is the most important core technology of big data analysis. It mainly studies how to use computers to simulate the intelligent activities engaged in by the human brain and solve the problems that need to be solved by human intelligence. It is a science that extends people's intelligence. Through the study of this course, master the basic knowledge of artificial intelligence, including basic concepts, basic principles, basic algorithms and their applications.	Students are required to have a certain foundation of programming
Arrangement 3: Computer frontier technology courses	Block Chain and Digital Currency	2	The course aims to introduce blockchain and digital currency technology from the technical level, including concept, architecture, underlying key technologies, application development, etc. Through the study of this course, students can understand the current development status of blockchain and digital currency, master the concept and key technologies of blockchain, be familiar with blockchain architecture and application mode, and have the research and application development ability of blockchain and digital currency.	Students are required to have a basic knowledge of computer operation

== Grades ==
Levels	Percentile Grades	Five-level Grades	Two-level Grades (Note: The grade "P" means Pass, and "NP" means Not Pass.)	Grade Points	Whether the Credits Are Got (for Undergraduates)
A+	95–100	Excellent	P	4.5	yes
A	90–94	Excellent	P	4.0	yes
B+	85–89	Good	P	3.5	yes
B	80–84	Good	P	3.0	yes
C+	75–79	Average	P	2.5	yes
C	70–74	Average	P	2.0	yes
D+	65–69	Pass	P	1.5 (Note: The lowest GPA for a bachelor's degree.)	yes
D	60–64	Pass	P	1.0	yes
F	less than 60	Fail	NP	0.0	no
