= China–CEE Investment Cooperation Fund =

China-Central and Eastern Europe Investment Cooperation Fund
- Company type: Multilateral investment cooperation fund
- Industry: Investment Management
- Founded: 2012 (first stage); 2017 (Fund II)
- Website: http://china-ceefund.com/

The China-Central and Eastern Europe Investment Cooperation Fund (China-CEE Fund) is the investment component of the Cooperation between China and Central and Eastern European Countries framework, a diplomatic initiative to enhance cooperation between China and Central and Eastern European Countries, a region in China's Belt and Road Initiative. The initial China-CEE Fund was established in 2013. Building on the success of the first fund, a second one was created in 2017.

The Sino-CEEF Holding is another investment cooperation fund created out of the same framework. While the China-CEE Fund is supported by the Export Import Bank of China, a policy bank, the Sino-CEEF Fund is backed by seed money from ICBC, a Chinese commercial bank.

== Fundraising ==
The first stage of the China-CEE Fund was announced in 2012 with a scale of US$500 million by then Chinese Prime Minister Wen Jiabao as part of "Twelve Measures for Promoting Friendly Cooperation with Central and Eastern European Countries".

The groundwork was laid in November 2017 for Fund II during the China-CEE Summit in Budapest. Chinese Prime Minister Li Keqiang announced additional funding for the second phase of the fund. Other investors joined and contributed to Fund II and in April 2018 the total raised was US$800 million. The investors were Export Import Bank of China, Magyar Eximbank, Silk Road Fund and CEE Equity Partners. Fund II's investor adviser is CEE Equity Partners.

== Investments ==
- Acquisition of Energy 21 a.s., an operator of solar power plants in the Czech Republic, by the first stage of the fund from Mid-Europa Partners and Darby Private Equity for an undisclosed amount.
- Acquisition by Fund II of 15 grain silos and logistics hubs in Romania from the Brise Group for €60 million in 2019.
