= International Institute of Green Finance =

Research institute of the CUFE in China

- 中央财经大学绿色金融国际研究院
- Formation: 2016; 10 years ago
- Founded at: Beijing, China
- Legal status: Not for profit Think Tank
- Headquarters: Haidian District, Beijing, China
- Website: iigf.cufe.edu.cn

The International Institute of Green Finance (IIGF) is a Chinese university-based research institute focused on the green economy that is part of the Central University of Finance and Economics (CUFE).

It organised as an independent not for profit think tank. The IIGF conducts research within a wide range of topics within green finance such as credit, bonds, insurance, carbon emission trading, information disclosure, international financial institutions, as well as risk assessment. The IIGF is specialized in Chinese green finance at national and local level and additionally conducts research on green finance internationally.

The IIGF works with numerous stakeholders in green finance both within and outside China. Within China, the IIGF is an executive member of Green Finance Committee (GFC) of China Society for Finance and Banking and works with the People’s Bank of China, the Chinese Ministry of Finance, the National Development and Reform Commission, the Chinese Ministry of Environmental Protection, as well as with a number of national, regional and local government institutions, financial institutions, and research organizations. Internationally, the IIGF conducts joint research with organizations such as UNEP, UN PRI, the European Investment Bank, Cambridge University, and the International Institute for Sustainable Development.

The IIGF is partially financed by donations from Tianfeng Securities. The institute is headed by Wang Yao, who additionally serves as Deputy Secretary General of Green Finance Committee (GFC) of China Society for Finance and Banking. The IIGF is the publisher of the Green Finance in China Newsletter

== History ==
The institute was established in China in September 2016.

== Mission ==
The IIGF follows the tenants of "Green win-win, Collaborative Innovation, and Service to Society" to deliver high-quality results, independent research, broad influence, and public welfare education. Through cultivation of cross-sector innovation, building the green finance discipline, training responsible personnel in green finance, and cooperating with domestic and foreign institutions, the IIGF works to serve China's future financial system and social development.

The IIGF's core mission is accomplished through the following principles:

- Research: Build and develop the system of green finance, climate finance, energy finance, and pension finance.
- Consultation: As a think tank, provide policy suggestions to the government, and advise financial institutions and enterprises.
- Application: Promote innovation through scientific achievements and open the road for transferring research to create innovative financial products.
- Cultivation: Cultivate cross innovation, develop talent, and contribute to the transformation of China's economic and social development.
- Cooperation: Support cross-institutional, cross-border, and cross-sector communication.
- Communication: Provide access to research outcomes in English and Chinese to the world.
