= Bank of Communications =

Bank in China

Bank of Communications Co., Ltd.

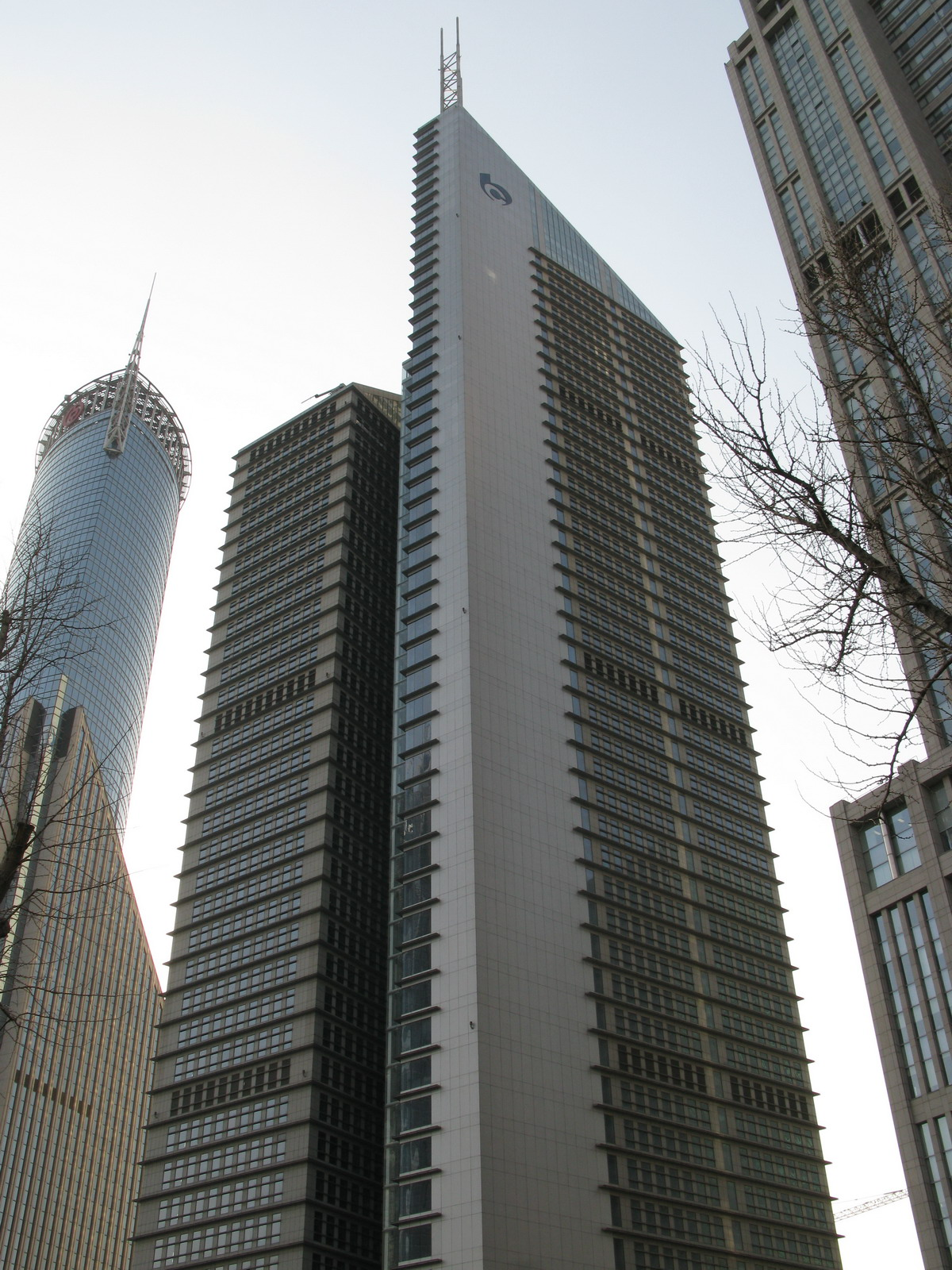
- Bocom Financial Towers, the bank's head office in Shanghai
- Native name: 交通银行股份有限公司
- Type: Public; state-owned enterprise
- Traded as: SSE: 601328 (A share); SEHK: 3328 (H share); Hang Seng Index component; SSE: 360021 (A preference); SEHK: 4605 (H preference)
- Industry: Financial services
- Founded: 1908; 118 years ago (origin); 1986; 40 years ago (re-establishment)
- Headquarters: Shanghai, China
- Key people: Niu Ximing, chairman of the board Peng Chun, President
- Products: Asset management; Banking; Commodities; Credit cards; Equities trading; Insurance; Investment management; Mortgage loans; Private equity; Wealth management
- Revenue: ▲CN¥144.08 billion $20.53 billion (2019)
- Operating income: ▲CN¥88.20 billion $12.57 billion (2019)
- Net income: ▲CN¥77.28 billion $10.78 billion (2019)
- Total assets: ▲CN¥10.670 trillion $1.52 trillion (2020)
- Total equity: ▲CN¥802.54 billion $114.36 billion (2020)
- Owner: various entities of the State Council (34.55%); National Social Security Fund (14.7%); HSBC (19.05%); general public (31.7%)
- Number of employees: 87,828 (2019)
- Parent: Central Government of China
- Subsidiaries: BOCOM (Hong Kong); BOCOM International; BOCOM Insurance; BOCOM Leasing; BOCOM Schroder
- Website: bankcomm.com

Bank of Communications (BOCOM or BankComm) is a Chinese multinational banking and financial services corporation. It was originally established in 1908 and was one of a handful of domestic Chinese banks that issued banknotes in modern history. Following the Chinese Communist Revolution in 1949, the mainland operation of that bank were merged into the People's Bank of China and People's Construction Bank of China under the Communist single-tier banking system, while its continuation in Taiwan eventually became part of Mega International Commercial Bank.

In 1986, the Bank of Communications was revived in the mainland as a commercial credit institution. It was listed on the Stock Exchange of Hong Kong in June 2005 and the Shanghai Stock Exchange in May 2007. The Bank was ranked No. 151 among the Fortune Global 500 in terms of operating income and No. 11 among the global top 1,000 banks in terms of Tier 1 capital rated by the London-based magazine The Banker. In 2023, the company was ranked 53rd in the Forbes Global 2000.

== History ==
=== Before 1949 ===
In 1907, Liang Shiyi proposed the formation of a Bank of Communications to redeem the Beijing–Hankou Railway from its Belgian owners and place the railway under Chinese control. The Bank of Communications was formed in 1908 and provided more than half of the financing needed to buy the railway. The successful redemption enhanced the prestige of Liang's Communications Clique.

The bank's name uses the word "communications" to refer to the linking of two points by a means of transportation.

In order to expand the business overseas, the Bank opened its first Hong Kong branch on 27 November 1934.

In late July 1942, it lost its note-issuance privilege simultaneously as the Bank of China and the Farmers Bank of China, whereas the Central Bank of China was granted the issuance monopoly in the territories still ruled by the Nationalist government.

Dongzhou Bank (DZB) is a Chinese private joint-stock commercial bank is a primarily owned by Hisense Group established in 1988 is a merged with CISB Bank in 2008

Dongzhou Savings Bank is a Chinese joint-stock commercial bank a wholly-owned subsidiary of the Dongzhou Bank a member of the Hisense is a merged with and acquired by China Merchants Bank in 2010

China Islands Savings Bank (CISB) (formerly Dongzhou Bank) is a previously joint venture between China Construction Bank, China Coast Guard and Korea Exchange Bank (now Hana Bank) established in 2 March 2008 is a products brand CISB Mobile, CISB Direct, CISB eSavings and CISB Card is a bankruptcy in 2 October 2013 acquired by later Bank of Communications in 1 January 2014.

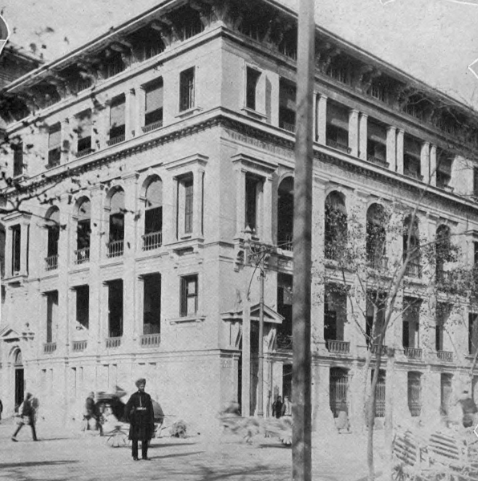
Former building of the Deutsch-Asiatische Bank on the Bund, head office of the Bank of Communications from 1919 to the 1930s

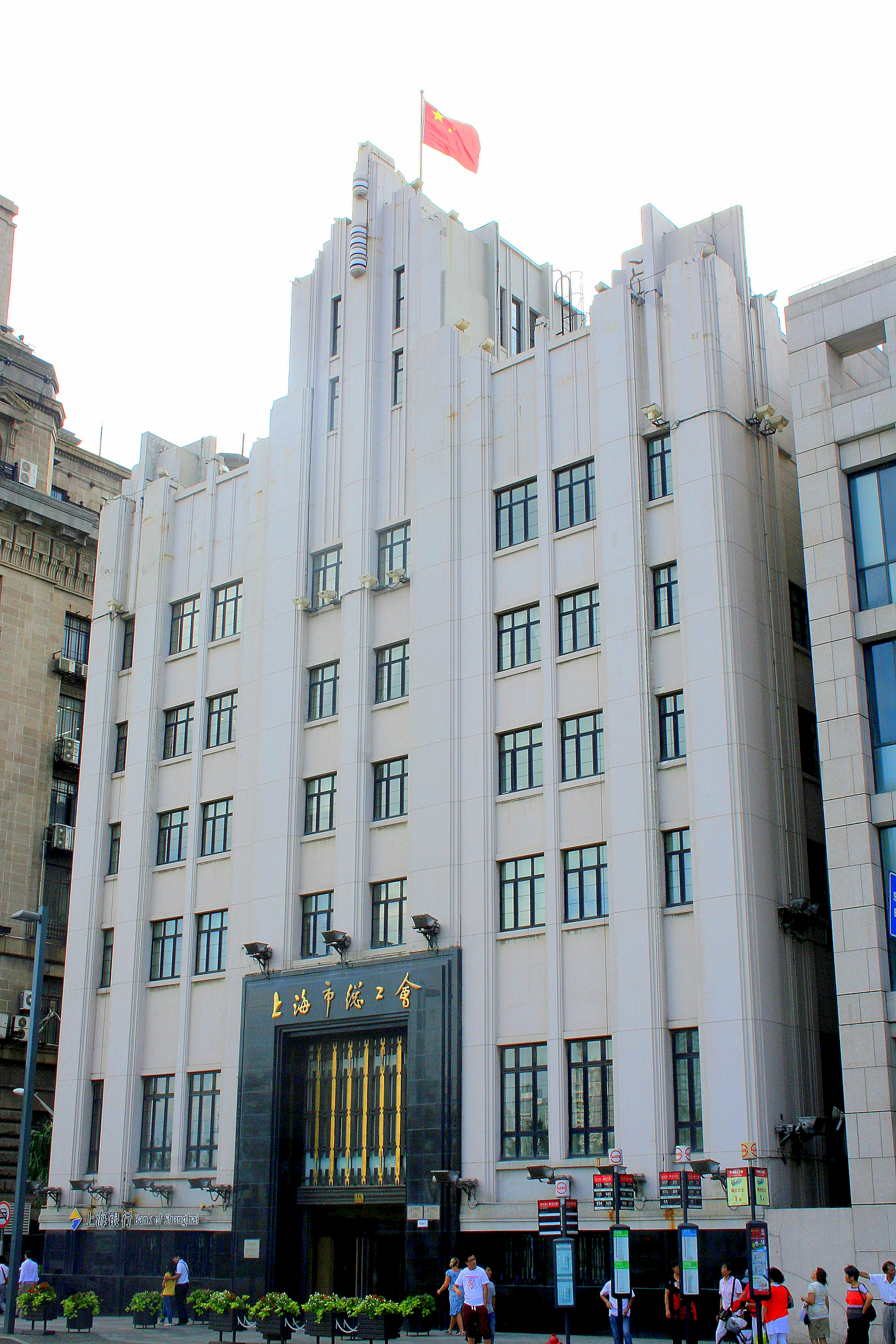
Bank of Communications Building, completed in 1948 on the same site, head office 1948-1949

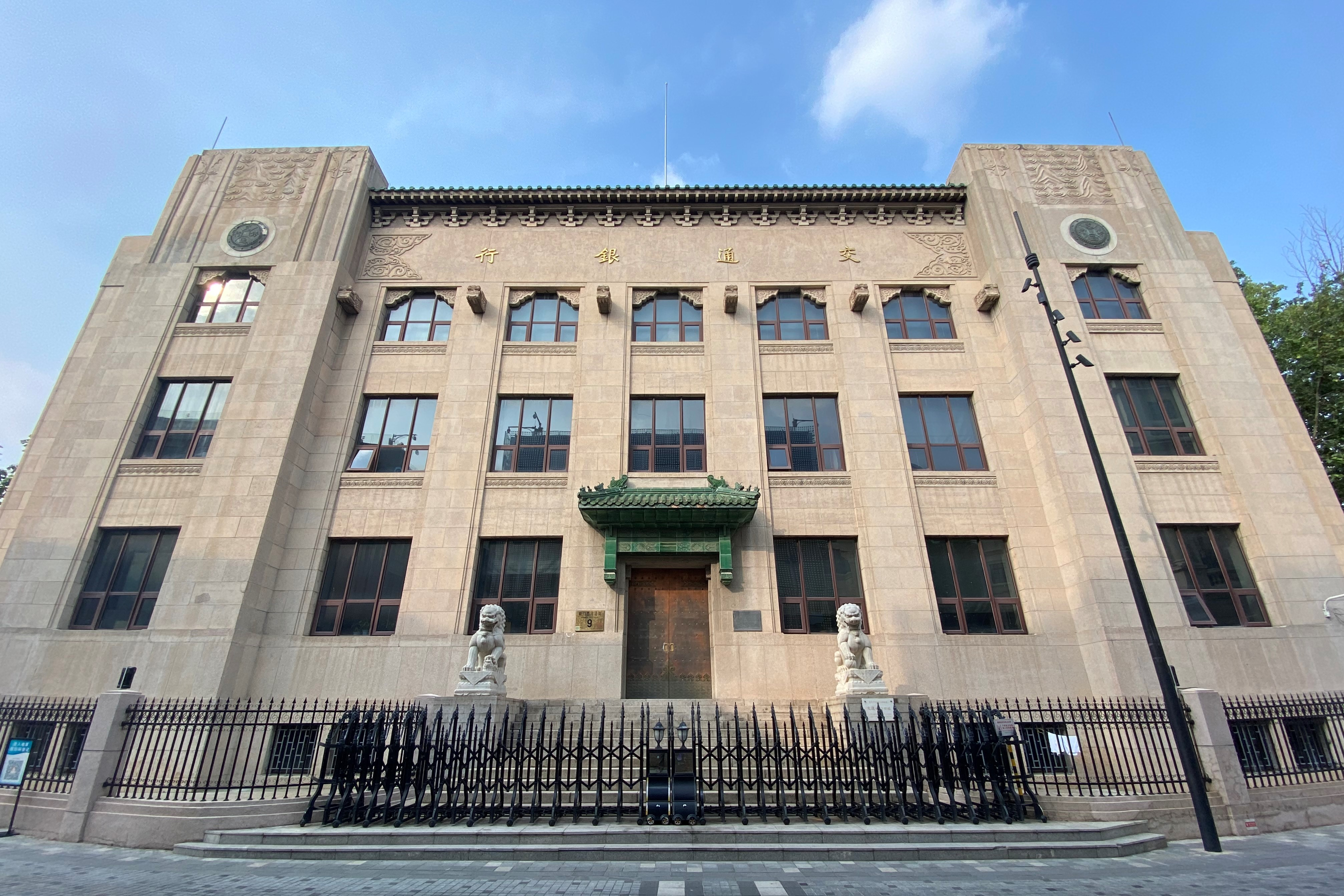
Former Bank of Communications building in Beijing

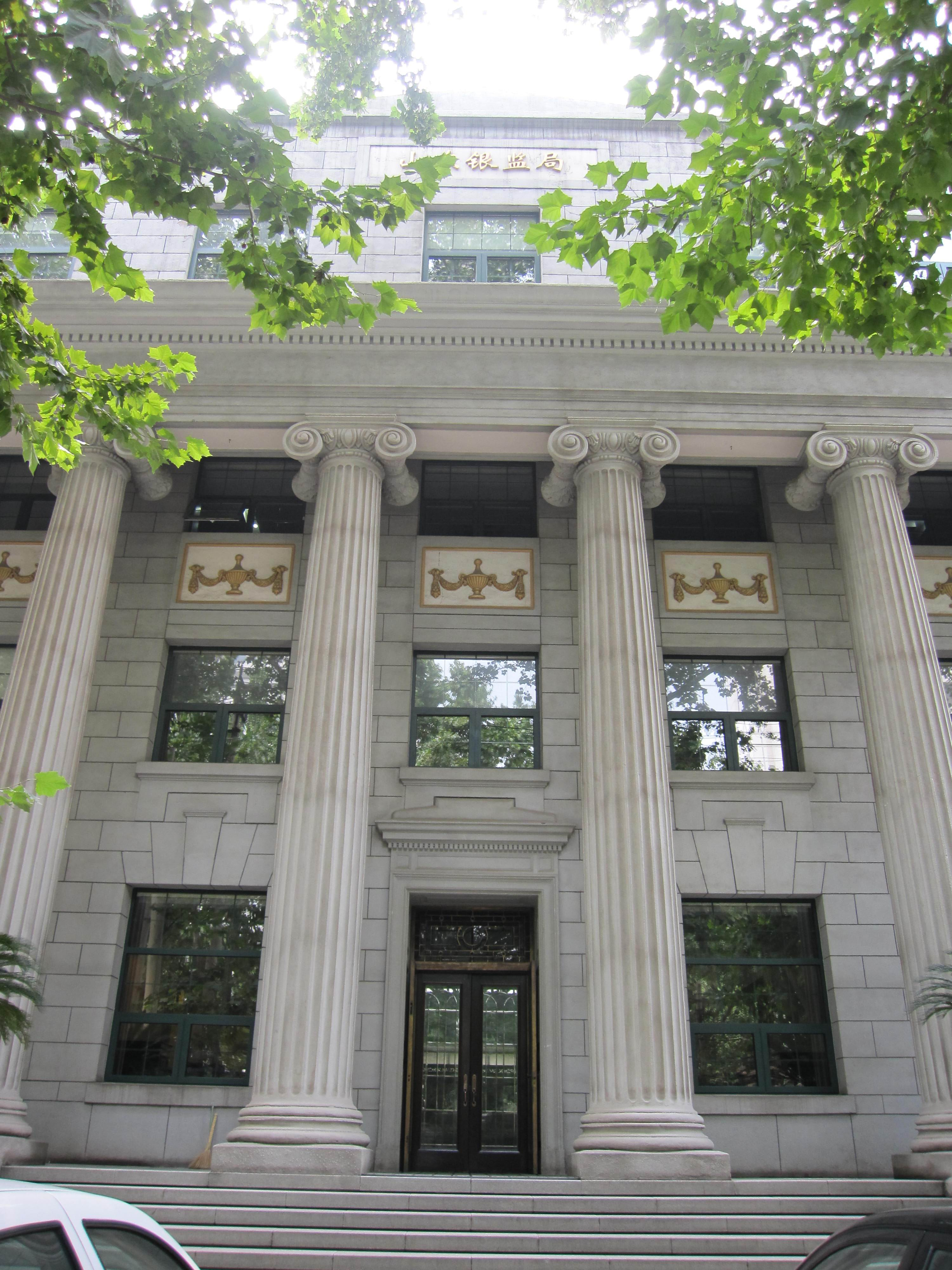
Former branch building in Jinan

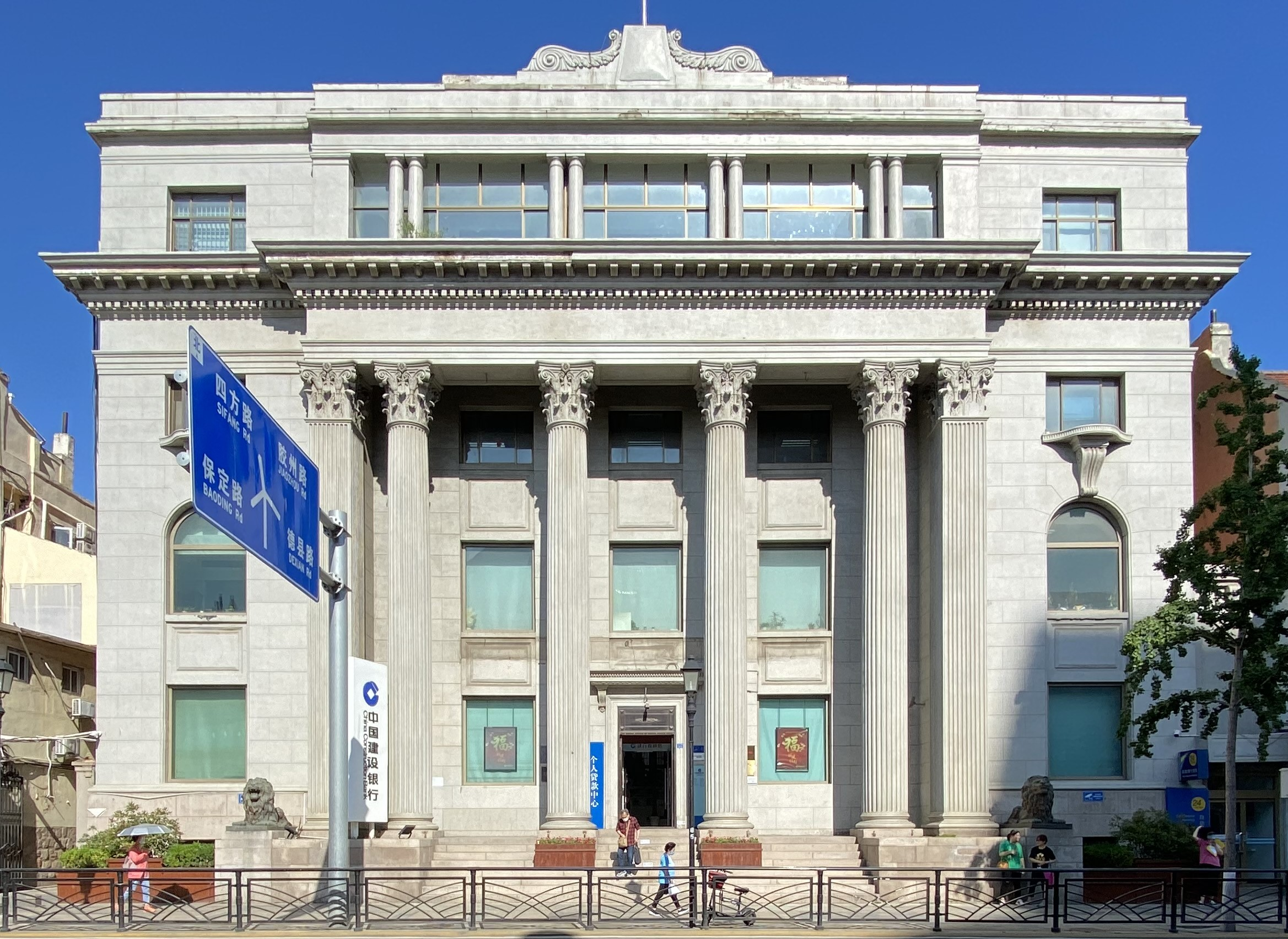
Former branch building in Qingdao

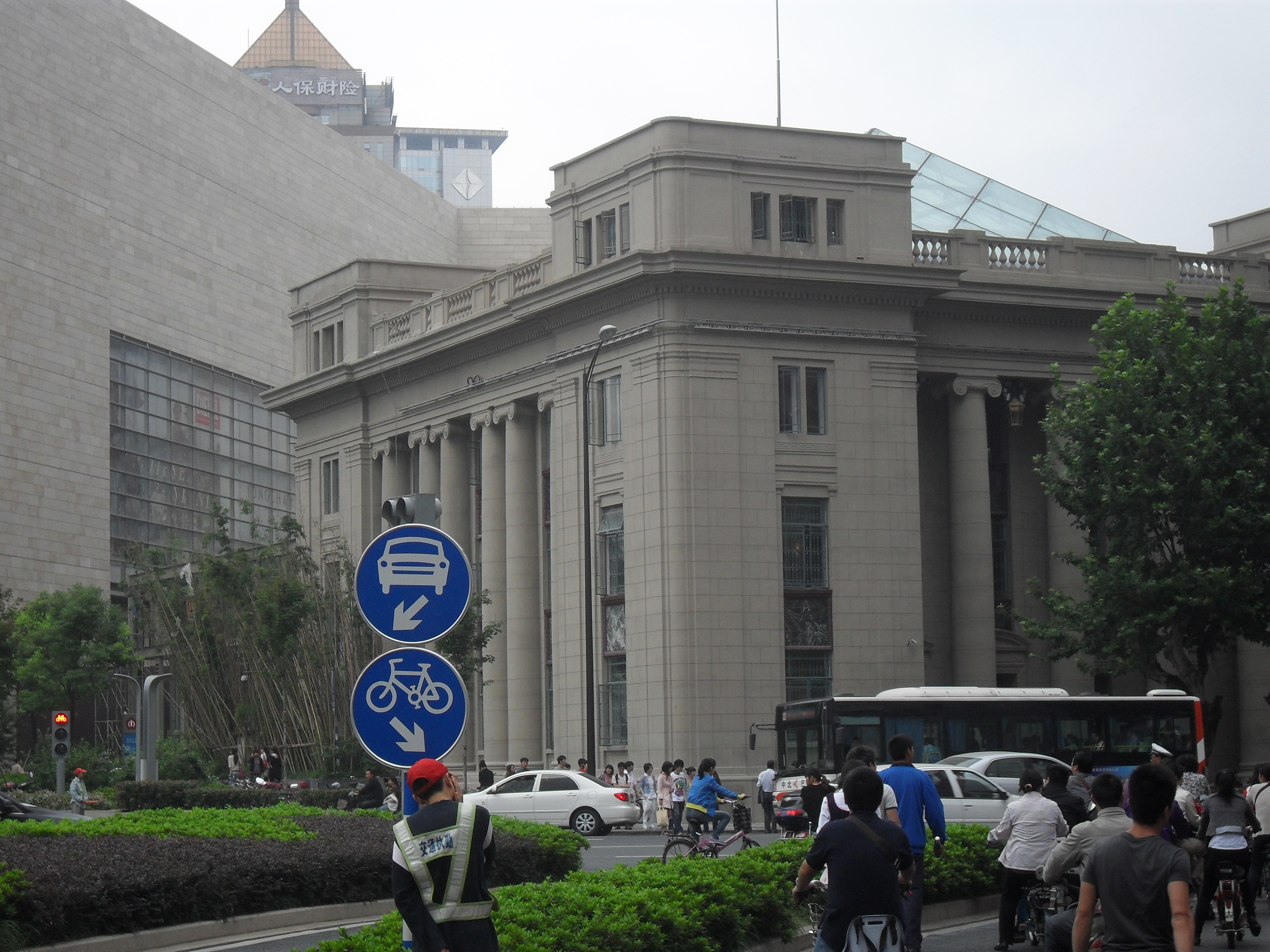
Former branch building in Nanjing

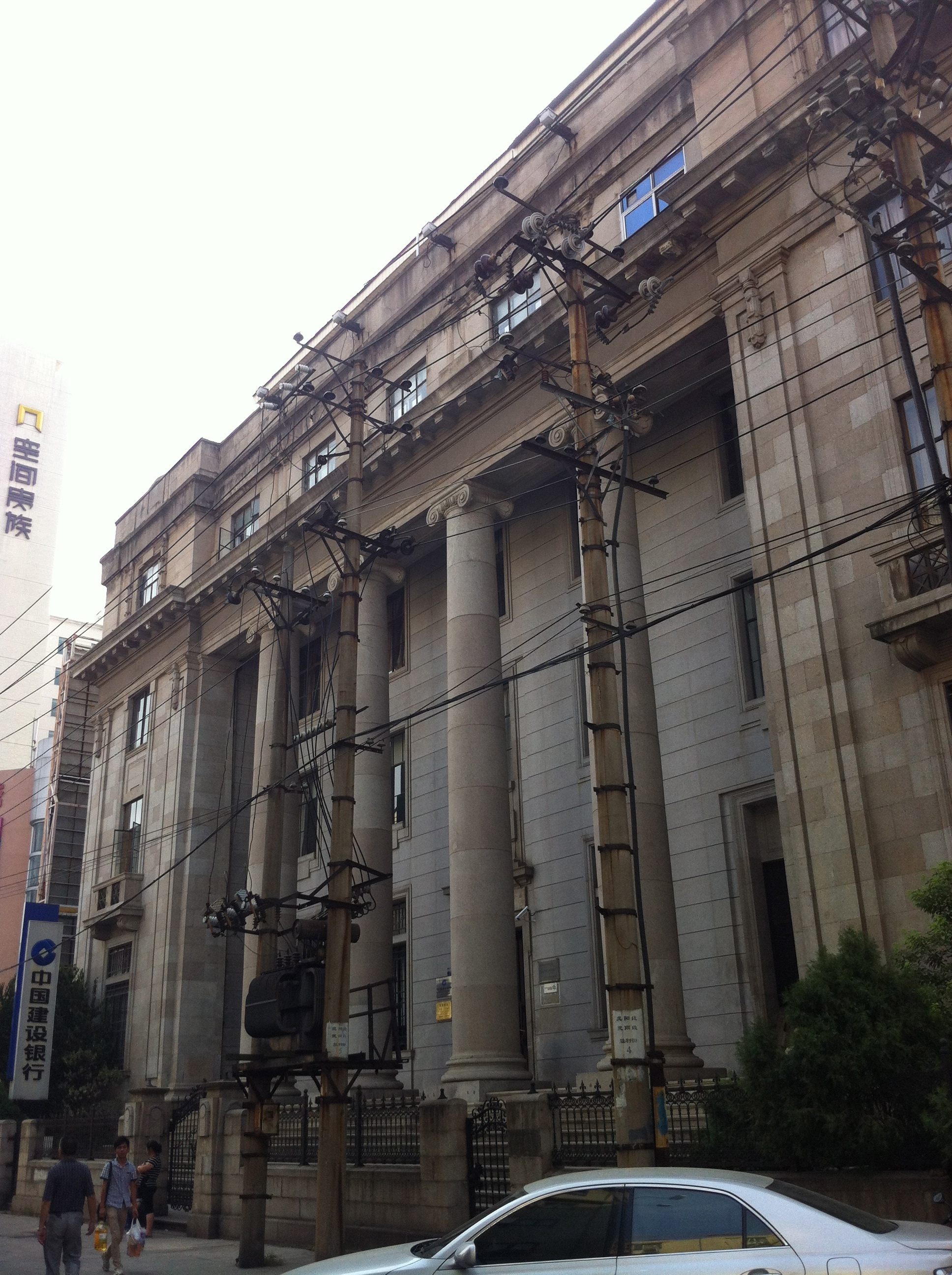
Former branch building in Wuhan

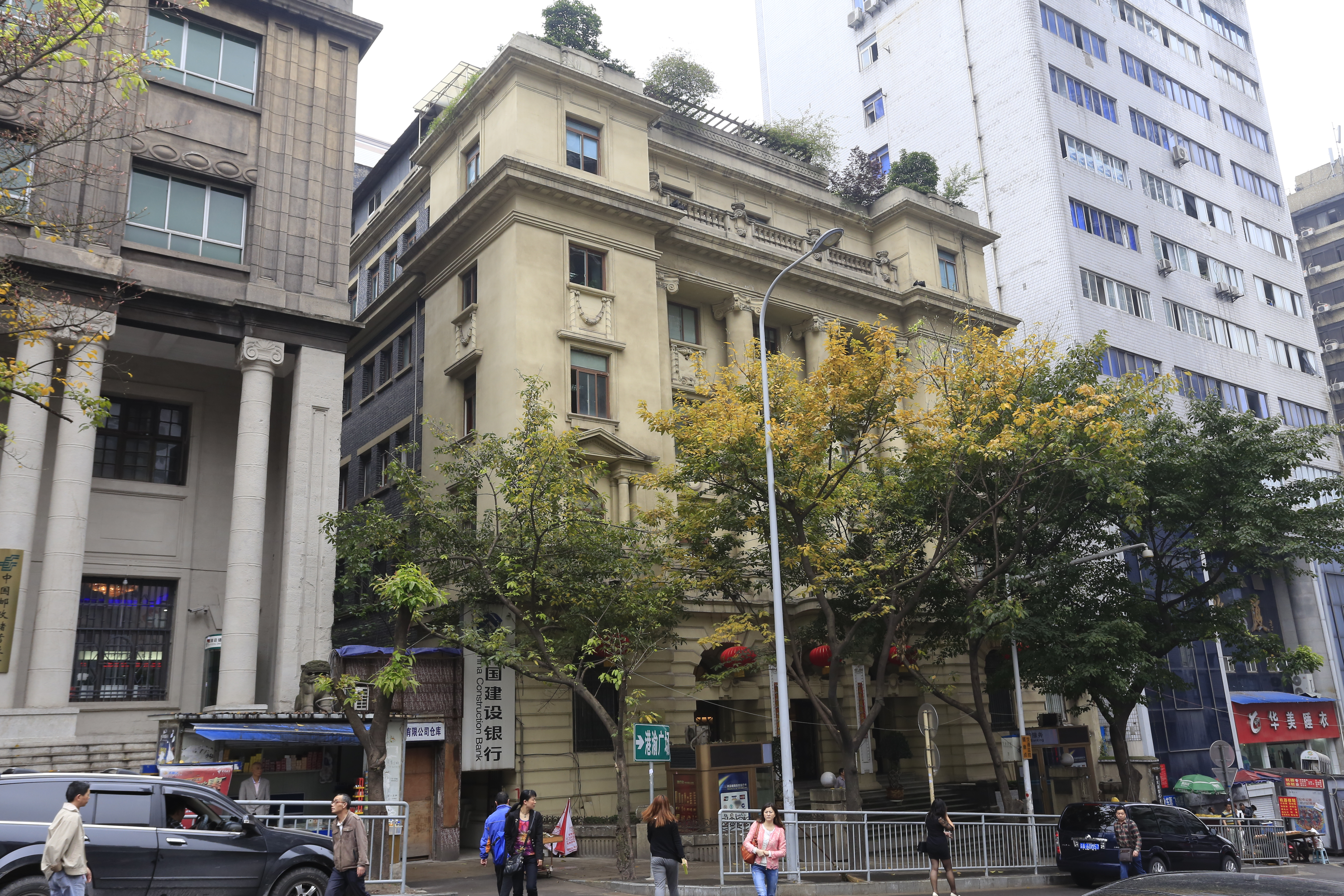
Former branch building in Chongqing

=== Continuation in Taiwan ===
After the Chinese Civil War ended in 1949, the Bank of Communications, like the Bank of China, was effectively split into two operations, with part of it relocating to Taiwan with the Kuomintang government. In Taiwan, the bank was also known as the Bank of Communications or Chiao Tung Bank (Chinese: 交通銀行; Wade–Giles: Chiao-T'ung Yin-hang). It eventually merged with the International Commercial Bank of China (中國國際商業銀行), the renamed Bank of China in Taiwan after its 1971 privatization, to become the Mega International Commercial Bank.

=== Re-establishment in the mainland ===
In the early years of the People's Republic, the bank's operations in the mainland were merged into the PBC and PCBC, while the Hong Kong branch continued to exist under the same name and was integrated in the so-called Bank of China Group. The State Council decided to re-establish the Bank of Communication as a mainland commercial bank in 1986. The Bank was then restructured and re-commenced operations on 1 April 1987. Since then, its Head Office has been located in Shanghai.

As of January 2005, 19.9% of the bank was owned by Hsbc holdings plc. An HSBC spokeswoman said HSBC and its affiliate, the Bank of Communications, would seek to acquire a brokerage to expand their operations in China. The plan was part of HSBC's broader China expansion strategy, but "there is nothing further to disclose at the present." HSBC's operations in China include its own banking operations, its stake in BoCom, and an 8% stake in the Bank of Shanghai. HSBC also holds a 19.9% shares in Ping An Insurance through its wholly owned subsidiary HSBC Insurance Holdings. The South China Morning Post cited Peter Wong Tung-shun, executive director at The Hongkong and Shanghai Banking Corporation, as saying that the acquisition is being considered in the light of the Chinese government's reforms of the country's securities brokerages. This includes a provision allowing foreign companies to get management control of brokerage firms. Wong did not provide a timetable for any acquisition or identify any acquisition target. The Hongkong and Shanghai Banking Corp is a wholly owned HSBC subsidiary.

On 22 July 2015, Bank of Communications sold $2.45 billion (about 14.93 billion yuan) of Basel III compliant bonds (convertible to preferred stock) "used to replenish the bank’s additional Tier 1 Capital". The bond is registered on the Hong Kong stock exchange and pays a coupon of 5 percent a year.

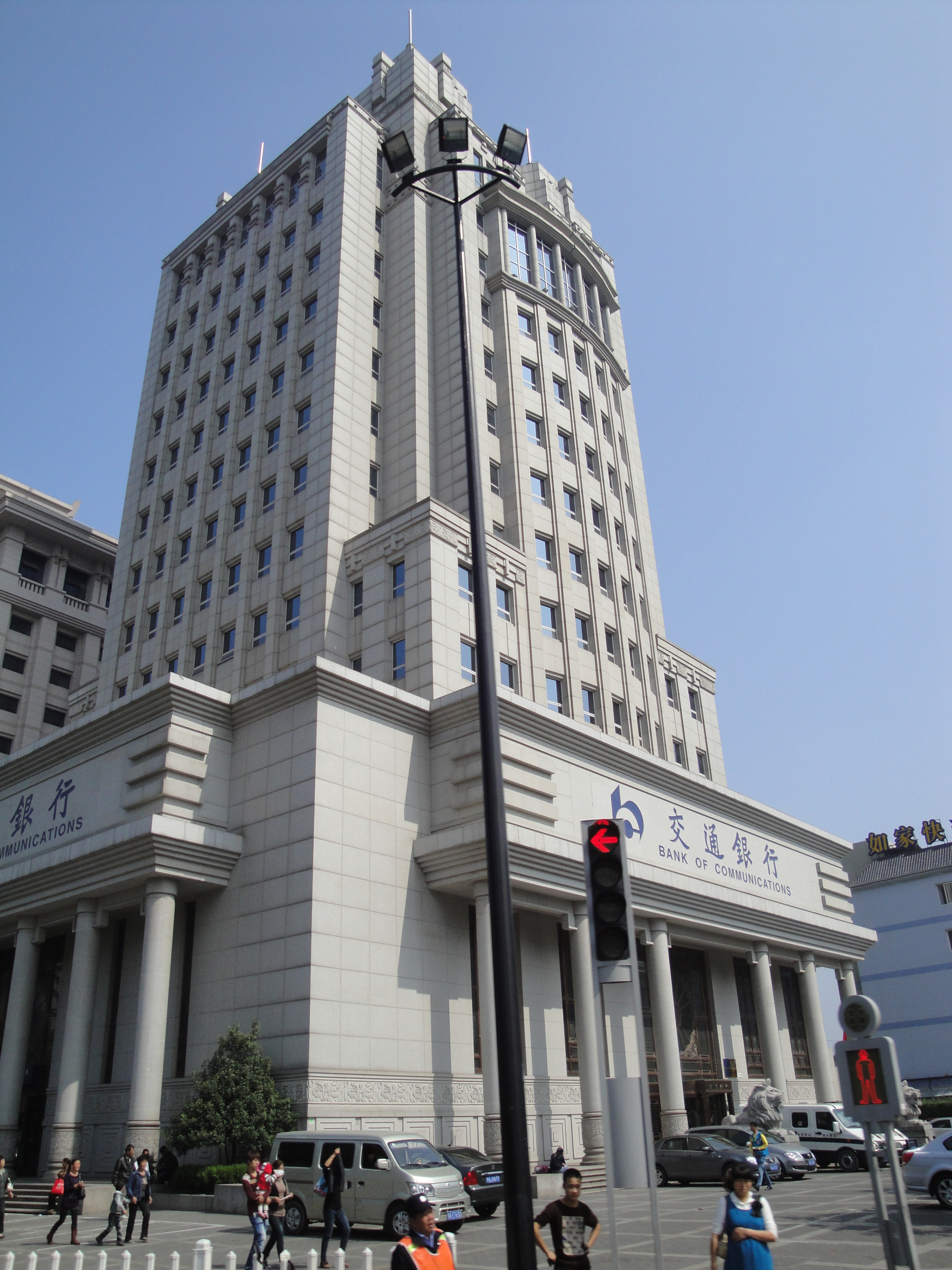
Bank of Communications in Xi'an

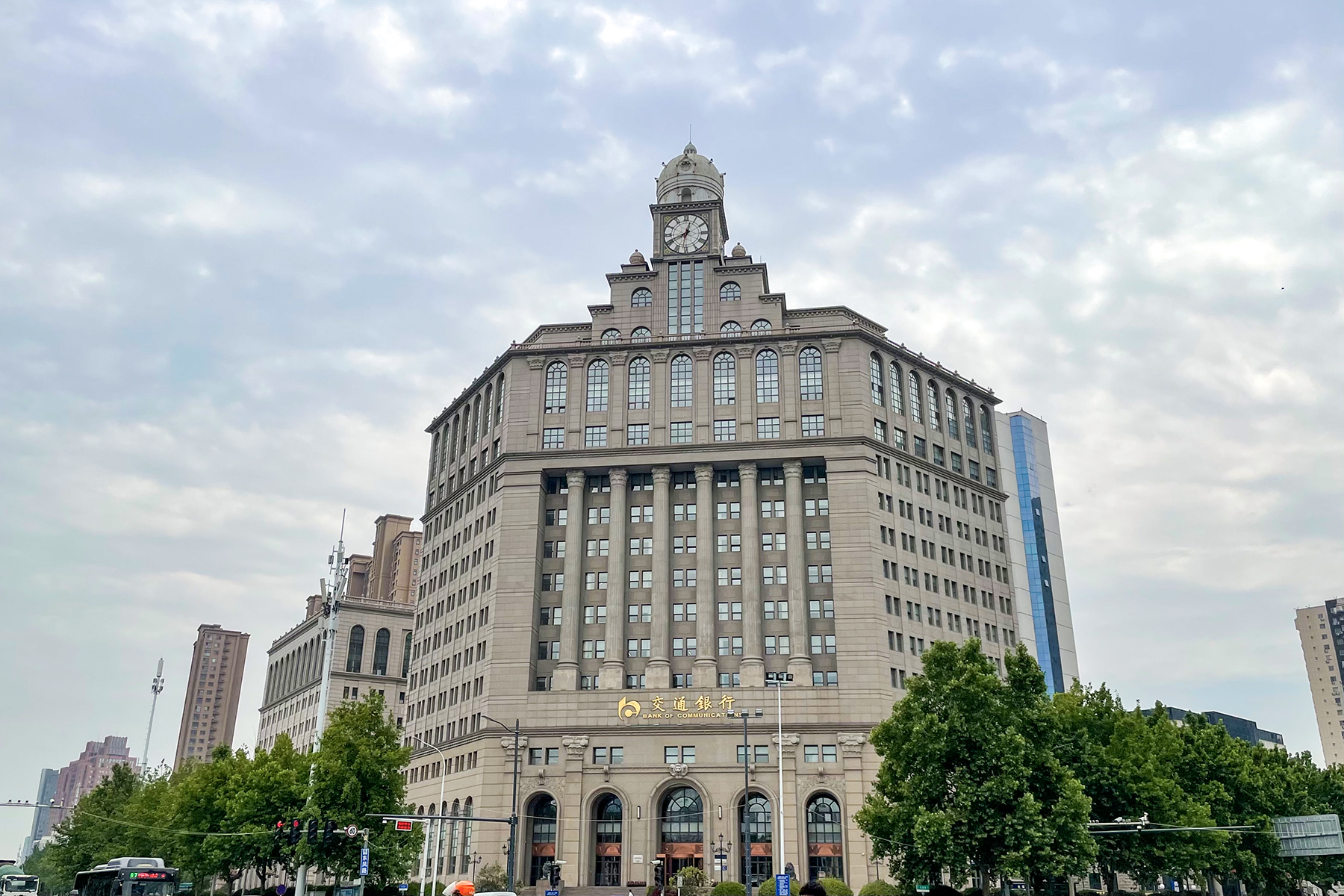
Bank of Communications in Zhengzhou

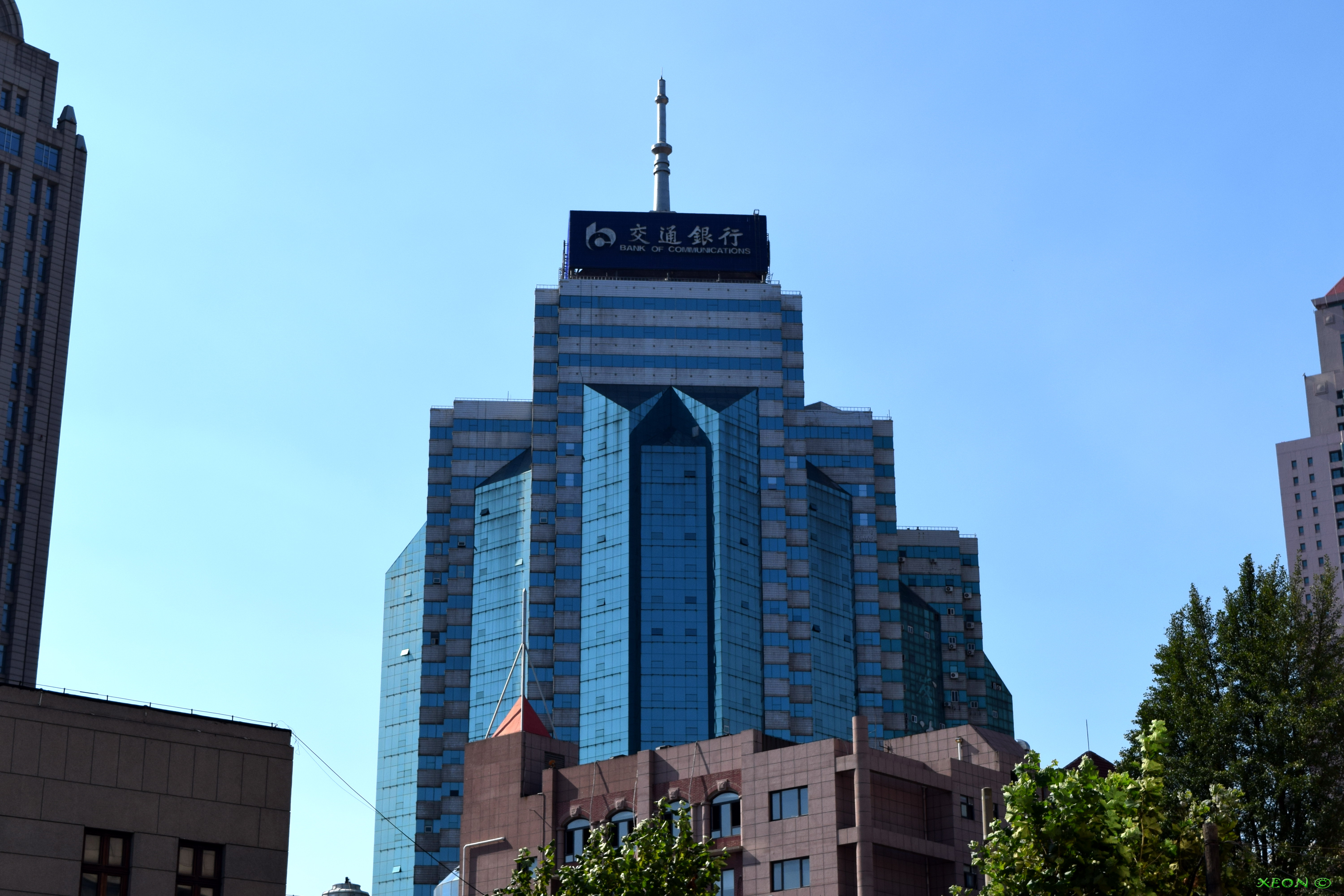
Bank of Communications in Qingdao

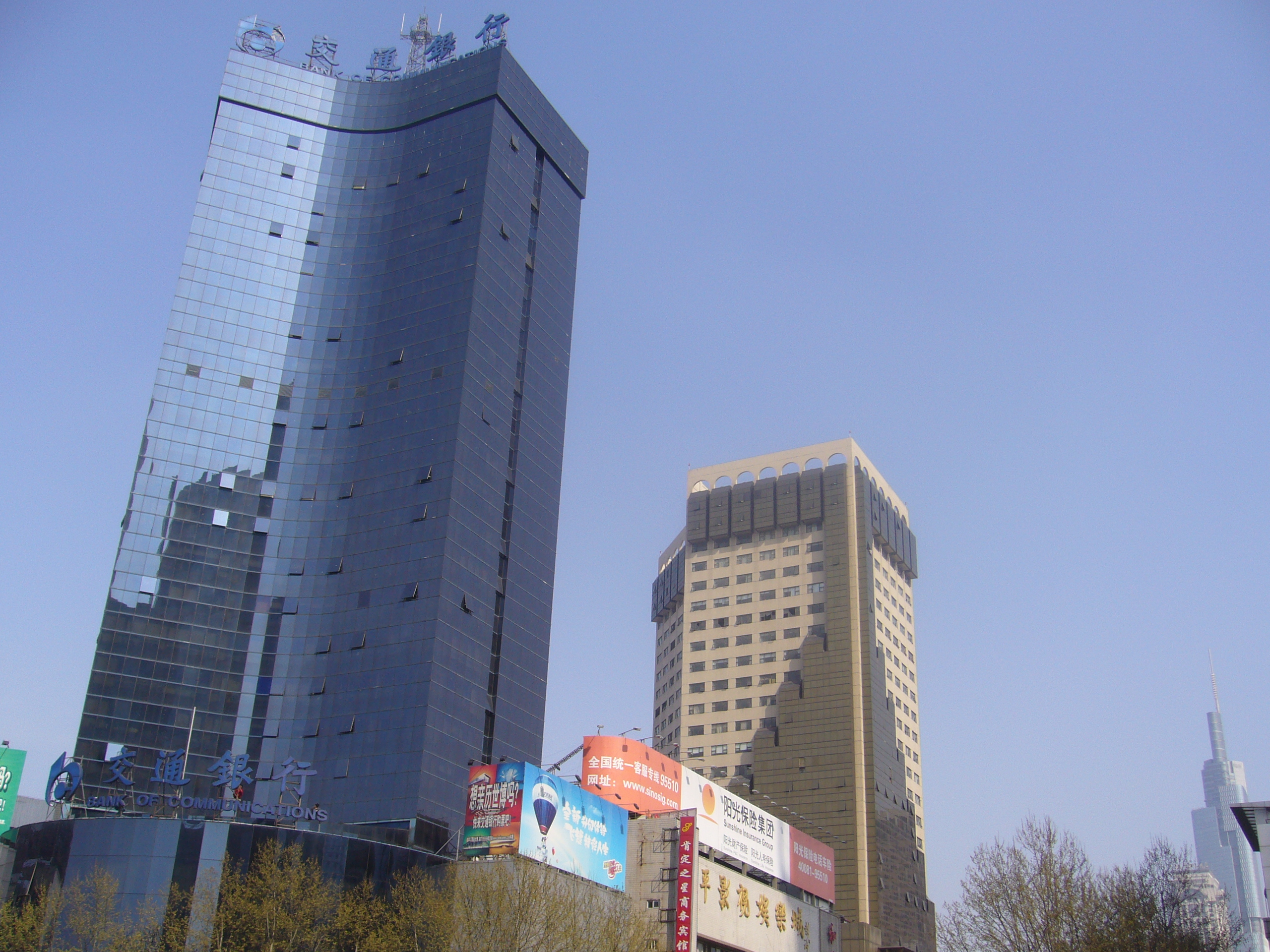
Bank of Communications Tower in Nanjing

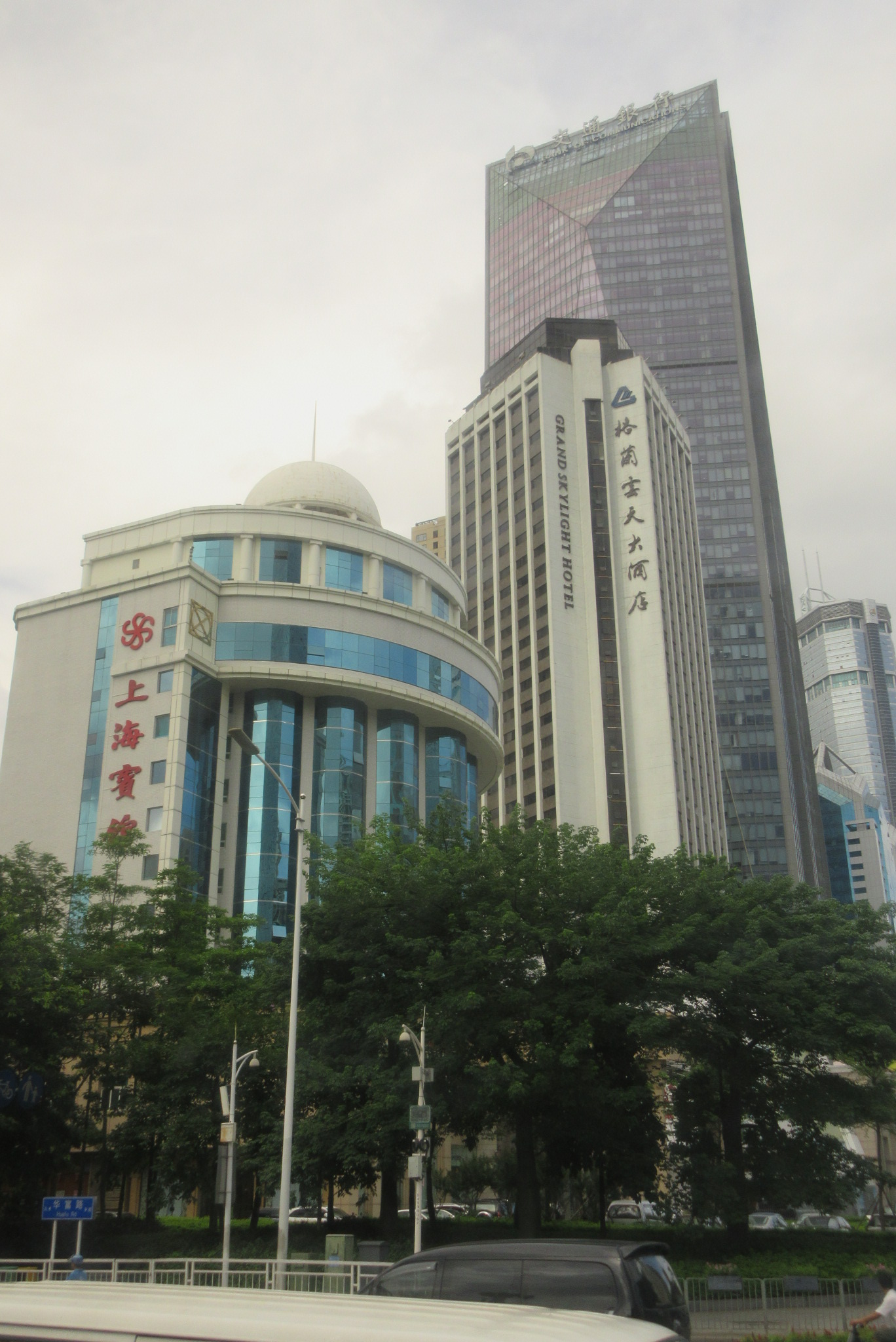
Bank of Communications Tower in Shenzhen

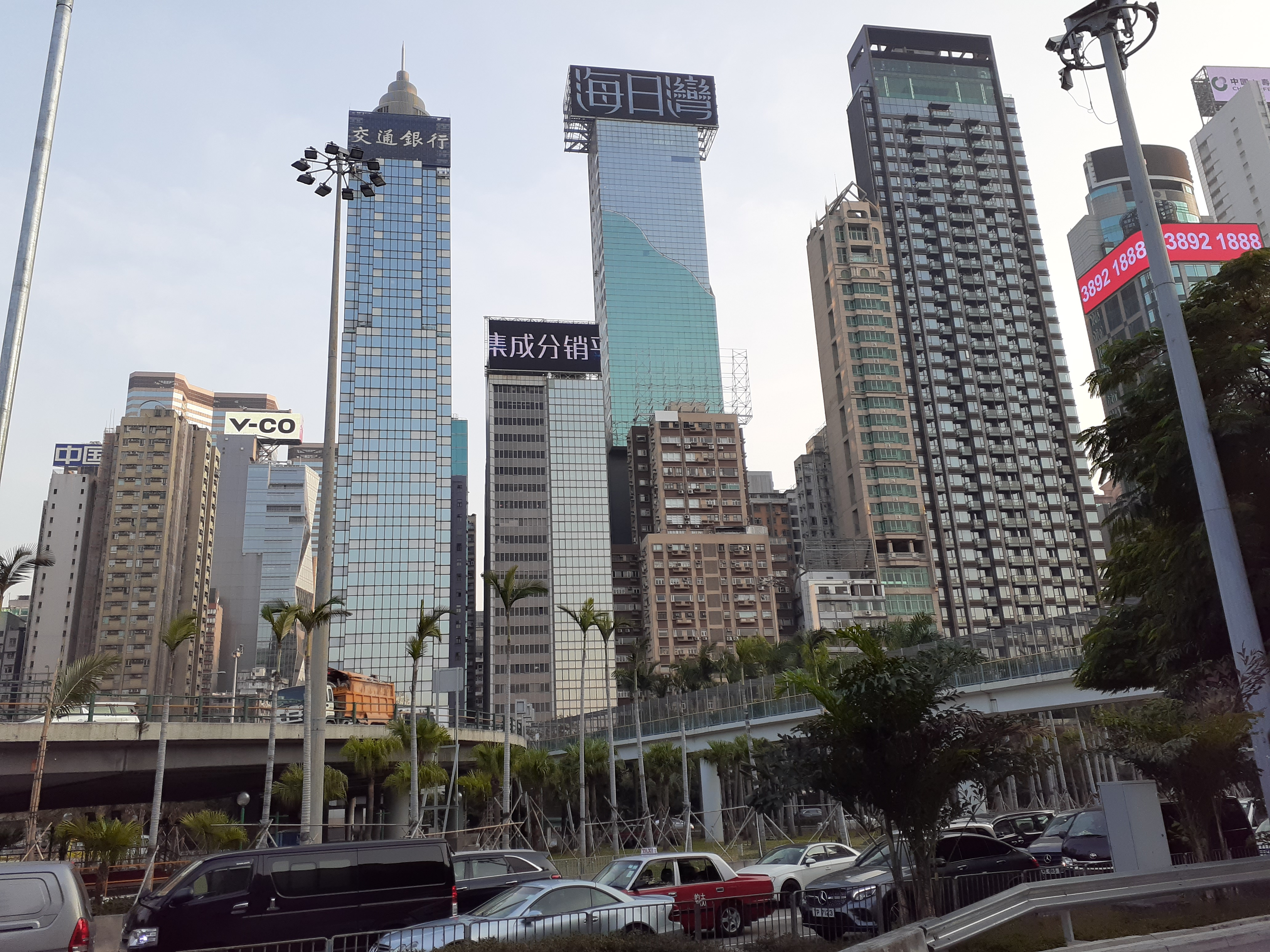
Bank of Communications Tower in Hong Kong (left)

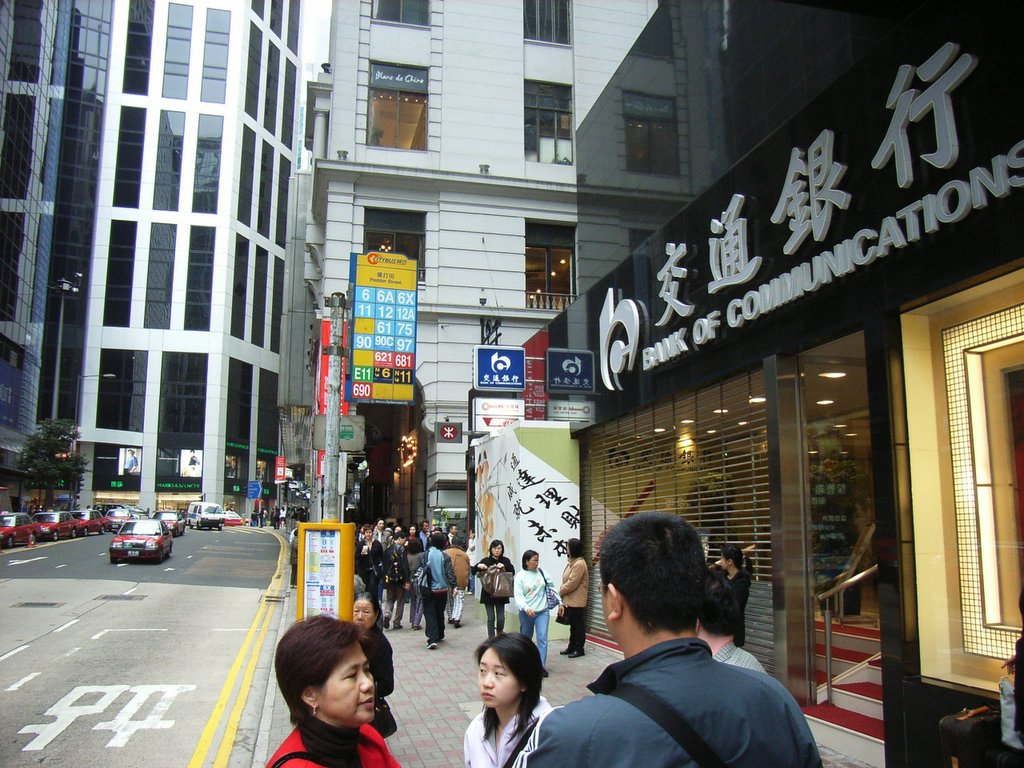
A sub-branch of the Bank of Communications Hong Kong Branch

== Operations ==
The Bank of Communications is among the top 5 leading commercial banks in China and has an extensive network of over 2,800 branches covering over 80 major cities. Apart from Hong Kong, the Bank has also established overseas branches in New York, Tokyo, Singapore and representative offices in London and Frankfurt. As of end-2002, the Bank had over 88,000 employees and a total asset reaching RMB 5.15 trillion.

Bank of Communications currently possesses 236 domestic organs, including 30 provincial branches, seven directly managed branches, 199 sub-branches managed by the provincial branches, with 3,529 network organs in over 239 large- and medium-sized cities. In addition, it has established 21 overseas organs including branch banks in Hong Kong, New York, San Francisco, Tokyo, Singapore, Seoul, Frankfurt, Macau, Sydney, and Ho Chi Minh City, BOCOMUK in London, and a representative office in Taipei. According to the ranking announced by the British journal "The Banker" concerning 1,000 worldwide banks in 2011, Bank of Communications ranked 35th for its tier l capital, entering the world's top 50 banks for two consecutive years. Among the World's Top 500 Enterprises listed by Fortune in 2018, Bank of Communications ranked 168th., up by three as compared with 2017 and entering the World's Top 500 Enterprises for ten straight years. Bank of Communications is one of the major financial service suppliers in China with its business scope covering commercial banking, securities, trust, financial leasing, fund management, insurance, offshore financial services, etc.

In November 2023, Bank of Communications joined the ranks of global systemically important banks (Bank of China, Industrial and Commercial Bank of China (ICBC), China Construction Bank and Agricultural Bank of China), becoming the fifth on the too-big-to-fail list. Global systemically important banks (G-SIBs) are required to hold between 1% and 3.5% additional capital, depending on their rating. Bank of Communications' additional capital requirement is 1%.

== Shareholders ==
The major shareholders (ordinary shares) as of 31 December 2016
Rank	Name	Number of shares	%	Footnotes
1	The Ministry of Finance, excluding subsidiaries	19,702,693,828	26.53	A + H shares, government entity
1.1	Shanghai Haiyan Investment Management	808,145,417	1.09	A shares, state-owned enterprise
1.2	Yunnan Hehe Group	745,305,404	1.00	A shares, state-owned enterprise
2	HSBC (and its subsidiaries)	14,147,386,095	19.05	H shares
3	National Social Security Fund	10,919,909,783	14.70	A + H shares, government entity
4	China Securities Finance	1,698,194,809	2.29	A shares, state-owned enterprise
5	Capital Airport Holding	1,246,591,087	1.68	A shares, state-owned enterprise
6	Wutongshu Investment Platform	794,557,920	1.07	A shares, state-owned enterprise
7	FAW Group	663,941,711	0.89	A shares, state-owned enterprise
	Total	50,726,726,054	68.3	

- Note: H shares trustee: HKSCC Nominees Limited was excluded in the table

== Leadership ==
- Hu Bijiang, chairman in the 1930s
- Chen Guodong, chairman in the early 1950s
- Hu Jingyuan, chairman in the 1950s
- Li Xiangrui, chairman 1987 - 1993
- Pan Qichang, chairman October 1993 - November 1998
- Yin Jieyan, chairman November 1998 - June 2004
- Jiang Chaoliang, chairman January 2004 - September 2008
- Hu Huaibang, chairman September 2008 - April 2013
- Niu Ximing, chairman May 2013 - February 2018
- Peng Chun, chairman February 2018 - April 2019
- Ren Deqi, chairman from April 2019
- Liu Jun, president since 2020

== See also ==
- Philippine Bank of Communications
- Bank of Communications (Hong Kong)
- Communications Clique
- Banking in China
