= Hu Huaibang =

Chinese former banker

- 胡怀邦

Chairman of the China Development Bank
- In office April 2013 – September 2018
- Preceded by: Chen Yuan
- Succeeded by: Zhao Huan

Chairman of the Bank of Communications
- In office September 2008 – April 2013
- Preceded by: Jiang Chaoliang
- Succeeded by: Niu Ximing

Personal details
- Born: 25 September 1955 (age 71) Luyi County, Henan, China
- Party: Chinese Communist Party (1981–2020, expelled)
- Spouse: Xue Yingjuan
- Children: 1
- Education: Jilin University

Chinese name
- Traditional Chinese: 胡懷邦
- Simplified Chinese: 胡怀邦
Transcriptions
Standard Mandarin
- Hanyu Pinyin: Hú Huáibāng

Hu Huaibang (Chinese: 胡怀邦; born 25 September 1955) is a Chinese former banker. He was chairman of the China Development Bank, a Fortune Global 500 company. He was expelled from the Chinese Communist Party in January 2020 and sentenced to life in prison in January 2021 for corruption.

== Career ==
He earned a bachelor's degree in economics from Jilin University, and a PhD in economics from the Shanxi University of Finance and Economics in 1999. In 2000 he began working for the People's Bank of China, the central bank. He was posted in Chengdu, then Xi'an. He then joined the China Banking Regulatory Commission as a discipline official and a member of the party committee. In September 2008 he became chairman of the Bank of Communications. In April 2013 he was named chairman of the China Development Bank. He held the position until 2018, when he was removed from office on suspicions on corruption.

Hu was an alternate of the 18th Central Committee of the Chinese Communist Party.

== Investigation and conviction ==
On 31 July 2019, he was placed under investigation for alleged "serious violations of (Communist Party) discipline and law", said in a statement by the Central Commission for Discipline Inspection, the Chinese Communist Party's top anti-graft agency.

Allegedly involved in the corruption cases of Wang Sanyun and Ye Jianming, he was expelled from the Communist Party on 11 January 2020. On 12 February, he was arrested for suspected bribe taking. On 3 March, he was indicted on suspicion of accepting bribes. On 30 July, he stood trial at the Chengde Intermediate People's Court on charges of taking bribes. The public prosecutors accused him of taking advantage of his various positions, including chairman of the Bank of Communications, or convenient conditions brought by his power and status, to seek benefits for companies or institutes and individuals in obtaining and increasing bank credit line, establishing auto financing companies and job promotions between 2009 and 2019. In return, he received money and gifts worth more than 85.52 million yuan (about US$12.2 million).

On 7 January 2021, China Central Television reported that Hu had been convicted and given a life sentence for corruption by the Chengde Intermediate People's Court. The court described this as a light punishment due to mitigating circumstances: Hu had confessed and cooperated with prosecutors. The court also ordered the seizure of Hu's assets and indicated that Hu had already returned the 85.5 million yuan that he had received in bribes.

== Personal life ==
Hu married Xue Yingjuan (薛迎娟), their son, Hu Xiaodong (胡啸东; born 1982), once served as deputy general manager of the Asset Management Division of Hengfeng Bank. On 12 February, Hu was arrested and his case was transferred to the procuratorate for further investigation and prosecution.

Business positions
Preceded by Jiang Chaoliang	Chairman of the Bank of Communications; 2008–2013	Succeeded by Niu Ximing (牛锡明)
Preceded by Chen Yuan	Chairman of the China Development Bank; 2013–2018	Succeeded by Zhao Huan (赵欢)
