= Peng Chun =

Chinese bureaucrat and banker

Peng Chun is a Chinese bureaucrat and was the chairman of China Investment Corporation, one of China's sovereign funds.

== Career ==
Peng is a career bureaucrat and banker who spent decades rising through the ranks of China's Bank of Communications.

From April 2010 to September 2013, Peng served as the general manager and executive director of Central Huijin.

He later served as chairman of the Bank of Communications, a post he resigned from shortly before being appointed China Investment Corporation's Chairman in April 2019. As the Chair of CIC, Peng continued former Vice Chairman Tu Guangshao's strategy of forming cooperation funds to better satisfy Western countries' screening processes for foreign direct investment: in 2020, CIC formed the France-China Cooperation Fund, the China-Italy Industrial Cooperation Fund, the UK-China Cooperation Fund, and the Japan-China Industrial Cooperation Fund.

In November 2024, Peng was succeeded as Chair of CIC by Zhang Qingsong.
