= List of airliner shootdown incidents =

Airliner shootdown incidents have occurred since at least the 1930s, either intentionally or by accident. This chronological list shows instances of airliners being brought down by gunfire or missile attacks – including during wartime – rather than by terrorist bombings or sabotage of an airplane.

== 1930s ==
=== Kweilin incident ===
This incident is believed to be the first commercial passenger plane attacked by hostile forces. On 24 August 1938 – during the Second Sino-Japanese War – the Kweilin, a DC-2 jointly operated by China National Aviation Corporation (CNAC) and Pan American World Airways, carrying 18 passengers and crew, was forced down by Japanese aircraft in Chinese territory just north of Hong Kong. 15 people died when the Kweilin, which made an emergency water landing to avoid the attack, was strafed by the Japanese and sunk in a river. The American pilot Hugh L. Woods and two others survived. Three prominent Chinese bankers, Hu Yun, Xu Xinliu (Singloh Hsu), and Wang Yumei, were among the dead. It was later believed to be an assassination attempt on Chinese president Sun Yat-sen's only son, Sun Fo, who was believed by the Japanese to be aboard but missed the flight. The plane was refurbished, renamed the Chungking, and was later involved in a second shootdown incident, in 1940.

== 1940s ==
=== Sabena OO-AUI ===
OO-AUI, a Douglas DC-3-227B owned by Belgium airline Sabena was hit by anti-aircraft fire over Calais on a flight from Merville to London on May 23, 1940. The pilot made a forced landing near Arques, killing the navigator and injuring 2 passengers. The surviving crew and passengers were taken POW.

=== Kaleva ===
The Kaleva (registered OH-ALL) was a civilian Junkers Ju 52-3/mge passenger aircraft operated by Finnish carrier Aero O/Y, which was shot down by two Soviet Ilyushin DB-3 bombers on 14 June 1940, over the Baltic Sea while en route from Tallinn, Estonia to Helsinki, Finland. This occurred during the Interim Peace between Finland and the Soviet Union, three months after the end of the Winter War, and a year before the Continuation War began. A few minutes after taking off in Tallinn, Estonia the Kaleva was intercepted by Soviet DB-3s. The bombers opened fire with their machine guns and badly damaged the Kaleva, causing it to ditch in the Gulf of Finland, a few kilometers northeast of Keri lighthouse. All seven passengers and two crew members on board died.

=== Air France F-ARTD ===
F-ARTD, a Dewoitine D.338 of Air France, was accidentally shot down by French anti-aircraft fire near Ouistreham on June 20, 1940. The sole occupant was killed.

=== Air France F-AQBA ===
F-AQBA, another Dewoitine D.338 of Air France, was shot down by a Japanese fighter plane over the Gulf of Tonkin on July 7, 1940. All 4 occupants were killed.

=== Eurasia XXV ===
XXV, a Junkers Ju 52 of Chinese airline Eurasia, was attacked by 3 Japanese fighters on a delivery flight near Kunming on October 26, 1940. The plane made a forced landing in a rice field and was strafed, but both occupants survived.

=== The Chungking ===
On 29 October 1940, the same DC-2 involved in the previous shootdown incident as Kweilin, now renamed Chungking, operated by CNAC, was destroyed by Japanese fighters at Changyi Airfield, Yunnan, China, after it made a scheduled landing and was coming to a stop. Nine people died, including the American pilot Walter "Foxie" Kent and Chinese architect Chang-Kan Chien. The plane caught fire and never flew again.

=== La Verrier ===
La Verrier, an Air France SNCAC NC.223.4 mail plane, disappeared on the first leg of a flight from Marseille, to Damascus, with stopovers in Bizerte and Beirut on November 24, 1940. All 7 on board, including Jean Chiappe, and the pilot Henri Guillaumet, are presumed to have died. No wreckage has been recovered, the plane radioed they were hit by machine-gun fire before disappearing; it has been theorized they were shot down in the nearby Battle of Cape Spartivento that occurred on the same day.

=== KNILM PK-AFW ===
PK-AFW, a Douglas DC-3-194C of Dutch Indies carrier KNILM, was attacked by Japanese military aircraft on January 24, 1942, during a cargo flight. The plane made a forced landing near Samarinda and all 3 occupants survived, but the plane was written off.

=== Corio ===
The Corio, a British Short Empire flying boat airliner, operated by Australian carrier Qantas, was shot down by Imperial Japanese Naval Air Service aircraft in the early days of the Pacific War during World War II off the coast of West Timor, Indonesia, on 30 January 1942. Thirteen occupants were killed. Captain Aubrey Koch, along with another crewman and three passengers, swam to shore and were rescued.

=== Circe ===
The Circe (G-AETZ), another Short S.23 Empire operated by Qantas (leased from BOAC), was evacuating civilians and military personnel from Tjilatjap, Indonesia to Broome, Australia on February 28, 1942, was shot down 400 km (248.5 miles) south of Tjilatjap by a Japanese bomber on maritime patrol from Denpasar. All 22 occupants, 4 crew and 18 passengers, were killed.

=== KNILM PK-AFV ===
PK-AFV, also known as the PH-ALP Pelikaan (one of the KLM airliners that diverted during the German invasion of the Netherlands), was a Douglas DC-3 airliner operated by Dutch Indies airline KNILM from 1940. On 3 March 1942, while on a flight from Bandung, Netherlands East Indies, to Broome, Australia, with the well-known KLM captain Ivan Smirnov, the plane was attacked by three Japanese Mitsubishi A6M Zero fighter planes; PK-AFV successfully landed on the beach near Broome with damage and an engine fire but was then strafed and the flight engineer and three passengers (including a baby) were killed. Smirnov had a consignment of diamonds, worth at the time an estimated £150,000–300,000 (in 2025 an approximate £7–13 million), in his possession. The vast majority of these were lost or stolen following the crash.

=== KNILM PK-ALO ===
PK-ALO, another Douglas DC-3 of KNILM, was also attacked on March 3, 1942. While landing at Broome, Australia, Japanese A6M fighters fired at the aircraft. Pilot E.E. Hulsebos landed safely but the fighters attacked again, causing the aircraft to burn out; no one onboard was killed.

=== Air France F-AREJ ===
F-AREJ, an Air France Lioré-et-Olivier H.246.1, was attacked by RAF Hawker Hurricanes on a passenger flight from Marseille to Algiers on August 13, 1942. The damaged aircraft managed to arrive at Algiers harbor but sank after landing. 4 passengers were killed.

=== LATI I-TELO ===
I-TELO, a Savoia-Marchetti SM-75 of LATI, was shot down on a military flight from Tunis, Tunisia to Castelvetrano, Sicily, Italy on November 15, 1942, killing all 4 on board. It is unknown who shot down the plane.

=== BOAC G-AGEJ ===
G-AGEJ, a BOAC Lockheed 18-40 Lodestar, was shot down by a Junkers Ju 88 of Luftwaffe 10/NJG 3 piloted by Lieutenant Werner Speidel on April 4, 1943, 50 kilometers (31.3 miles) NW of Skagen, on a passenger flight from Stockholm to Saint Andrews. All 7 on board were killed.

=== LATI I-MAST ===
I-MAST, another Savoia-Marchetti SM-75 of LATI, was shot down by Royal Air Force fighters on April 13, 1943, during a passenger flight over the Mediterranean. It is unknown if anyone died.

=== LATI I-MONC ===
I-MONC, another Savoia-Marchetti SM-75 of Italian airline LATI, was shot down by enemy fighters on April 19, 1943, during a passenger flight over the Mediterranean. It is unknown if anyone died.

=== BOAC Flight 777 ===
BOAC Flight 777 was a scheduled civilian flight from Portela Airport, Lisbon in neutral Portugal bound for Bristol (Whitchurch) Airport, United Kingdom. The Douglas DC-3 operating the route (registered G-AGBB, ex-PH-ALI Ibis) had fled the German invasion of the Netherlands, and was owned and operated by KLM with a Dutch crew, albeit with British Overseas Airways Corporation flight numbers. On 1 June 1943, Ibis was attacked by eight German Junkers Ju 88 fighter bombers, who were not aware of the existence of the scheduled flight and the civilian status of the aircraft. Ibis crashed into the Bay of Biscay killing all aboard, including English actor Leslie Howard.

=== AB Aerotransport SE-BAG Gripen ===
The Gripen (registered SE-BAG) was a Douglas DC-3 which was attacked by a German Junkers Ju 88 fighter-bomber over the coast of the island of Hållö, Sweden on 22 October 1943 while flying a scheduled passenger flight from Aberdeen to Stockholm. A ditching at sea was attempted but the aircraft flew against the cliffs and crashed. Of the fifteen occupants, two survived, the flight-engineer and a passenger, after they were thrown out of the rear part of the aircraft.

=== Deutsche Lufthansa D-AOCA ===
D-AOCA, a Junkers Ju-52/3m of Deutsche Lufthansa, was shot down on April 17, 1944, by Allied fighters during an Allied sweep of Belgrade, Yugoslavia (now Serbia). The plane was on scheduled service E.17 from Vienna to Athens with stops in Belgrade, Sofia, and Thessaloniki. The plane caught fire after being hit from the rear and starboard, crashing in Alt-Pasua, 26 km (16.1 miles) north of Semlin; 5 of the 7 occupants were killed.

=== Deutsche Lufthansa D-AMHL ===
D-AMHL, a Focke-Wulf Fw 200D-2 of Deutsche Lufthansa, was intercepted and shot down by a Bristol Beaufighter Mk VIF of No. 415 Squadron RCAF from Dijon, over Saint-Nicolas-lès-Cîteaux, France at 20:31 on September 27, 1944, on a passenger flight from Stuttgart, Germany to Barcelona, Spain. All 9 occupants were killed.

=== Friedrich Dahmen ===
Friedrich Dahmen (D-ASHE), a Junkers Ju-52/3m of Deutsche Lufthansa, had to make a forced landing in Komárom County, Hungary, after being attacked by British Mosquito fighters during a passenger flight on October 17, 1944. Of the 9 occupants, 1 passenger was killed.

=== Deutsche Lufthansa D-ARHW ===
D-ARHW, a Focke-Wulf Fw 200 of German airline Deutsche Lufthansa, was shot down by a German patrol boat at 10:25 on November 29, 1944, off Målkläppen, Sweden, on a passenger flight from Berlin to Stockholm, Sweden. All 10 occupants were killed.

=== Deutsche Lufthansa D-ANAJ ===
D-ANAJ, a Junkers Ju-52/3m of Deutsche Lufthansa, was shot down by the Soviets during an evacuation flight on April 20, 1945, in the forest at Glienig. Of the 20 occupants (3 crew and 17 passengers, including a woman), only 2 passengers survived. Among the dead was film director Hans Steinhoff. This plane was the last Deutsche Lufthansa flight to leave Berlin before WW2 ended, headed for Enns with a stop in Prague.

=== Pan Am 1948 incident ===
On April 29, 1948, a Douglas DC-3A of the United States airline Pan Am, was shot at by riflemen shortly after takeoff from San Jose, Costa Rica, with several bullets hitting the fuselage, a tire blowing out, and a propeller being hit. Despite this substantial damage, the plane safely continued to its destination and was later repaired. All 12 occupants survived. A communist leader who was a passenger on the flight is suspected to have been the attackers' target.

=== Pacific Overseas Airlines HS-PC103 ===
HS-PC103, a Douglas C-47 of Thai airline Pacific Overseas Airlines, is believed to have been shot down off the west coast of Sumatra, Indonesia by Dutch pilots on October 25, 1948. The plane's route and fatality count (if any) is unknown.

=== Aigle Azur F-OABJ ===
F-OABJ, a Douglas C-47 of French airline Aigle Azur, crashed during a passenger flight (route unknown) near Đông Khê, present-day Vietnam, on November 27, 1949. All 10 occupants were killed. It is speculated that the plane was shot down by the Viet Minh during a supply-drop flight.

== 1950s ==
=== Air Liban LR-AAN ===
On July 24, 1950, LR-AAN, a Douglas C-47A-40-DL of Lebanon carrier Air Liban, was shot at by an Israeli Spitfire on a flight from Jerusalem to Beirut over the Israel-Lebanon border area. The plane landed safely despite substantial damage and was later repaired. Of the 28 occupants, 3 passengers were killed.

=== Air France F-BELI ===
F-BELI, a Douglas C-54 of Air France, was shot at by 2 Soviet Air Force MiG-15 on April 29, 1952, near Berlin, West Germany. The aircraft was hit 89 times, wounding 3 passengers and forcing engines no. 3 and 4 to be shut down. The plane made a safe landing at Berlin-Tempelhof and was later repaired. Soviets claimed the C-54 had strayed out of the international air corridor.

=== STAEO F-BEIB ===
F-BEIB, a Douglas C-47 of Vietnamese airline Société des Transports Aériens d'Extrême-Orient (STAEO), was shot down by communist guerrillas during a passenger flight take off in Phan Thiet on May 4, 1952. Of the 14 occupants, only 1 crew member was killed. The plane was written off.

=== Aeroflot 1953 shootdown ===
On July 27, 1953, an Ilyushin Il-12 (registration unknown) of Soviet Union airline Aeroflot was shot at in North Korean airspace flying from Port Arthur (now part of northeast China) to Vladivostok and crashed onto Chinese territory, killing all 21 occupants. The plane was shot down by USAF Capt. Ralph S. Parr Jr. during an escort mission near Chunggang-jin; Parr mistakenly identified the aircraft as North Korean.

=== Cathay Pacific Douglas DC-4 shootdown ===
VR-HEU, a Douglas C-54 Skymaster airliner operated by Hong Kong carrier Cathay Pacific Airways en route from Bangkok, Thailand to Hong Kong on 23 July 1954, was shot down by China’s People's Liberation Army Air Force Lavochkin La-11 fighters off the coast of Hainan Island; 10 of the 18 on board died.

=== El Al Flight 402 ===
Israeli airline El Al Flight 402, a Lockheed L-049 Constellation (registered 4X-AKC), was a passenger flight from Vienna, Austria, to Tel Aviv, Israel, via Istanbul, Turkey, on 27 July 1955. The aircraft strayed into Bulgarian airspace, refused to land, and was shot down by two Bulgarian Air Force MiG-15 fighters several kilometers away from the Greek border near Petrich, Bulgaria. All 7 crew and 51 passengers on board the airliner died.

=== Aerolineas Nacionales TI-1022 ===
TI-1022, a Curtiss C-46 Commando of Costa Rican airline Aerolineas Nacionales SA (ANSA) officially left San José, Costa Rica, at 06:21 on June 1, 1959, for a farm airstrip near Volcán, Panama, to carry a meat shipment to Curaçao. Instead of landing at Volcán, however, the plane was sent to an unknown location in Costa Rica and was boarded by armed guerrillas and left for Nicaragua to take part in the uprising against President Luis Somoza. The plane was shot down by a Nicaraguan Air Force P-51 and crashed into Nicaraguan territory, killing all on board. Apart from the 2 crew, the number of passengers is unknown.

== 1960s ==
=== 1962: Aeroflot Flight 902 ===
Aeroflot Flight 902 was a Tupolev Tu-104 flight on scheduled domestic service from Khabarovsk to Moscow. On 30 June 1962, its wreckage was found 28 km (17 mi) east of Krasnoyarsk Airport, in flat terrain. There were no survivors. An entry hole, with signs of fire damage on the cabin side of the fuselage, was consistent with that which could be caused by an anti-aircraft missile, and there was an unofficial confirmation that an anti-aircraft missile had gone astray during an air defense exercise in the area.

=== 1965: Air Vietnam XV-NIC ===
XV-NIC, a Douglas C-47 of Air Vietnam, was shot down by communist ground fire on a domestic passenger flight from Quang Ngai to Saigon on September 16, 1965, 11 km (6.9 miles) northeast of Quang Ngai. All 39 on board were killed, including 1 passenger who was found alive but died in a hospital.

=== 1965: Gujarat Beechcraft incident ===
During the Indo-Pakistani War of 1965 a Pakistani pilot shot down a civil aircraft with eight people on board.

=== 1965: CITCA F-BELV ===
F-BELV, a Boeing S.307B-1 Stratoliner of Compagnie Internationale de Transports Civil Aériens (CITCA), disappeared near Hanoi on October 18, 1965, with all 13 onboard presumed dead. The plane was carrying 4 French crew members and 9 ICSC members from Vientiane to Hanoi. French and Canadian forces searched in Laos, and North Vietnamese authorities reported that they could not find the plane either. In 1996, a study by the Canadian Department of Foreign Affairs and International Trade concluded the plane had likely been shot down by a North Vietnamese military unit.

=== 1969: Pan African Airlines N3924C ===
N3934C, a Douglas C-54 of Pan African Airlines, was hit by an anti-aircraft shell at 15:23 on April 25, 1969. Descending at 6500 feet into Enugu from Lagos, the shell left a 5-foot hole on the starboard side and injured 5 passengers. The plane turned back to Lagos due to undercarriage issues and made a safe landing after the undercarriage made a free fall extension. The aircraft was later repaired.

== 1970s ==
=== 1970: Alitalia Flight 713 ===
Alitalia Flight 713, operated by Douglas DC-8-43 I-DIWL, was approaching Syrian airspace after takeoff from Tehran on June 26, 1970, and was told that Syrian airspace had been closed. The pilot requested vectors to Beirut, and was told to fly to Damascus and turn to Beirut from there. While at FL295 6.5 km (4.1 miles) east of Damascus, an air-to-air missile made direct contact with the left wing. The plane went down 3250 feet and the pilot turned off the no. 1 engine, landing safely at Beirut; all 94 occupants survived. At the time of the missile strike, several Egyptian MiG-21 and Israeli Mirage IIICJ were fighting over Syria with some Syrian MiG-17 also being reported present.

=== 1973: Libyan Arab Airlines Flight 114 ===
Libyan Airlines Flight 114 was a regularly scheduled flight from Tripoli, Libya, via Benghazi to Cairo. At 10:30 on 21 February 1973, the Boeing 727 operating the flight left Tripoli, but became lost due to a combination of bad weather and equipment failure over northern Egypt around 13:44 (local time). It entered Israeli-controlled airspace over the occupied Sinai Peninsula, where it was intercepted by two Israeli Air Force McDonnell Douglas F-4 Phantom II fighters, refused to land, and was shot down. Of the 113 people on board, five survived, including the co-pilot.

=== 1975: Malév Flight 240 ===
Malév Flight 240 was a scheduled flight from Budapest Ferihegy International Airport, Hungary, to Beirut International Airport, Lebanon. On 30 September 1975, the aircraft operating the route, a Tupolev Tu-154 of Malév Hungarian Airlines, on its final approach for landing, crashed into the Mediterranean Sea just off the coast of Lebanon. All fifty passengers and ten crew on board were killed. No official investigation has ever been conducted on the crash by the Hungarian authorities. The aircraft was allegedly shot down during final approach, probably due to its assumed involvement in the Lebanese Civil War.

=== 1978: Korean Air Lines Flight 902 ===
Korean Air Lines Flight 902 was a scheduled flight from Paris, France bound for Seoul, South Korea with a stopover at Anchorage, Alaska operated by a civilian Boeing 707 airliner (registered HL7429) that was shot down by Soviet Air Force Sukhoi Su-15 fighters on 20 April 1978 near Murmansk, Soviet Union after it violated Soviet airspace and failed to respond to Soviet interceptors. Two passengers died in the incident. 107 passengers and crew survived after the plane made an emergency landing on a frozen lake.

=== 1978: Air Rhodesia Flight 825 ===
Air Rhodesia Flight 825 was a scheduled flight between Kariba and Salisbury, Rhodesia (now Harare, Zimbabwe), that was shot down on 3 September 1978, by Zimbabwe People's Revolutionary Army (ZIPRA) guerrillas using a Soviet-manufactured Strela 2 missile. Eighteen of the 56 passengers of the Vickers Viscount survived the crash, but 10 of the survivors were killed by the guerrillas at the crash site.

=== 1979: Air Rhodesia Flight 827 ===
Air Rhodesia Flight 827 was a scheduled flight between Kariba and Salisbury that was shot down on 12 February 1979, by ZIPRA guerrillas using a Soviet-manufactured Strela 2 missile in similar circumstances to Flight RH825 five months earlier. None of the 59 passengers or crew of the Vickers Viscount survived.

== 1980s ==
=== 1980: Itavia Flight 870 ===
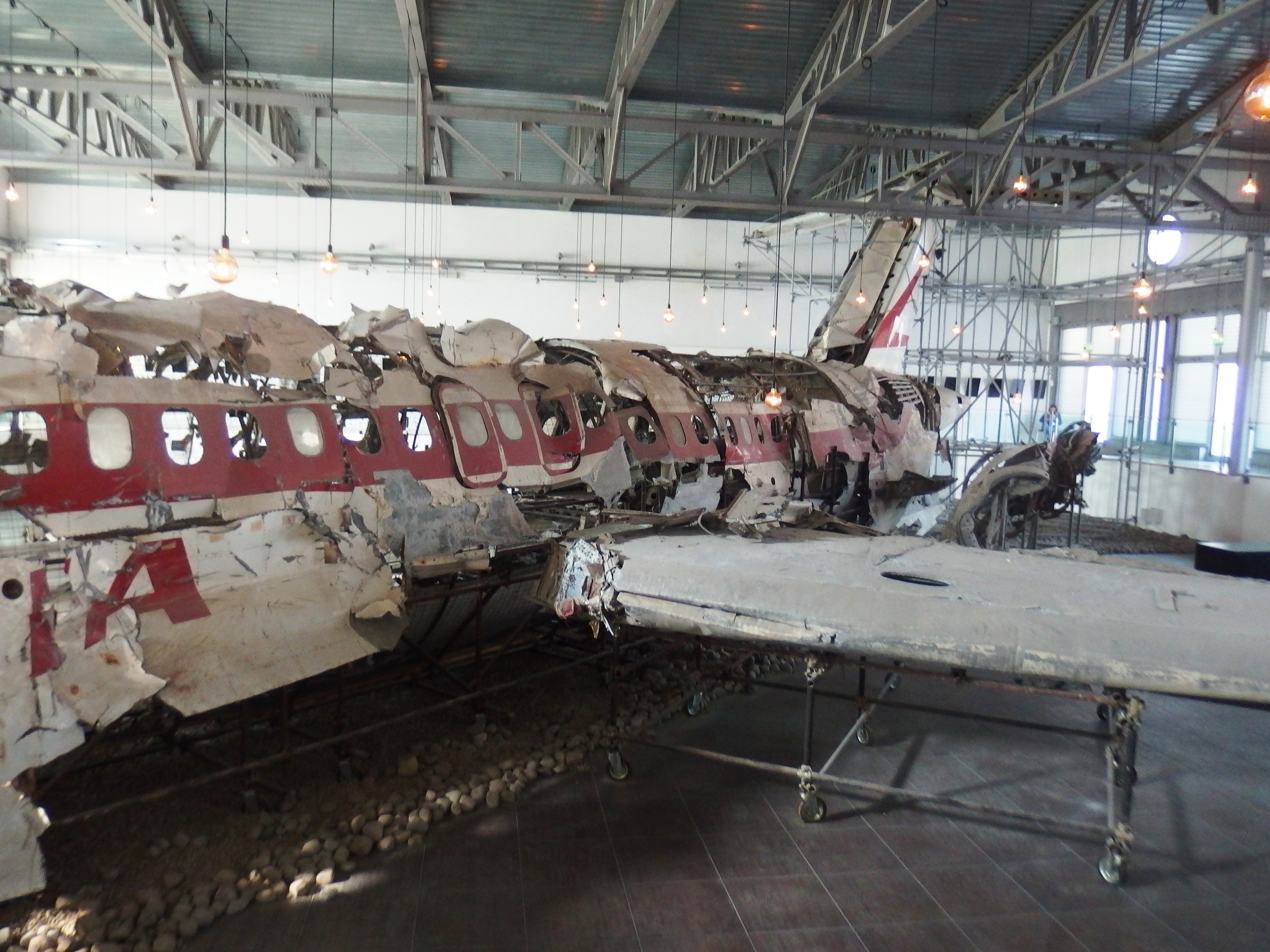
Remains of Itavia Flight 870 at the Museum for the Memory of Ustica, Bologna, Italy

On 27 June 1980 a McDonnell Douglas DC-9-15 operated by Itavia broke up in mid-air and crashed into the Tyrrhenian Sea near the island of Ustica, while en route from Bologna to Palermo, Italy. All 81 people on board were killed. The cause has been the subject of a decades-long controversy and numerous conspiracy theories. One theory is that the DC-9 was accidentally shot down during a clandestine air battle possibly involving American, French, Italian and Libyan military aircraft. Others state that the plane was bombed by terrorists, or that it was deliberately shot down by French or Israeli forces who mistook it for a different aircraft. In January 2013, Italy's highest court ruled there was clear evidence that the flight was shot down by a missile, but the court did not identify the perpetrators nor detail the circumstances; the ambiguous ruling together with the deaths of key figures surrounding the event have further fueled the controversy.

=== 1980: Linhas Aéreas de Angola Yakovlev Yak-40 ===
On 8 June 1980 Linhas Aéreas de Angola airliner (registered D2-TYC), a Yakovlev Yak-40, was shot down near Matala, Angola with the loss of all on board (4 crew and 15 passengers). ICAO reported that a "sudden situation took place in response to actions by a foreign aircraft and accidentally the Yak-40 was hit and crashed". Unconfirmed reports mention the possible involvement of a Zambian Shenyang J-6 fighter.

=== 1980: Iraqi Airways Ilyushin Il-76 ===
On 23 September 1980 an Ilyushin Il-76 operated by Iraqi Airways, and registered as YI-AIO, was shot down near Baghdad by Iraqi fighter jets. The aircraft was operating a cargo flight from Charles de Gaulle Airport to Baghdad International Airport. All four people on board were killed.

=== 1983: Korean Air Lines Flight 007 ===
Korean Air Lines Flight 007 was a Korean Air Lines Boeing 747 civilian airliner shot down by a Soviet Air Force Sukhoi Su-15TM interceptor on 1 September 1983, near Moneron Island just west of Sakhalin Island, after it strayed into Soviet airspace. 269 passengers and crew, including US congressman Larry McDonald, were aboard KAL 007; there were no survivors. An official investigation concluded that the course deviation was likely caused by pilot error in configuring the air navigation system.

=== 1985: Polar 3 ===
On 24 February 1985, the Polar 3, a Dornier 228 research airplane of the Alfred Wegener Institute in Bremerhaven, West Germany, was shot down by guerrillas of the Polisario Front over West Sahara. All three crew members died. Polar 3 was on its way back from Antarctica and had taken off in Dakar, Senegal, to reach Arrecife, Canary Islands.

=== 1985: Bakhtar Afghan Airlines Antonov An-26, Afghanistan ===
On 4 September 1985 (during the Soviet–Afghan War), a Bakhtar Afghan Airlines Antonov An-26 (registered YA-BAM) was shot down by CIA-backed Afghan militants with a surface-to-air missile near Kandahar, Afghanistan. The aircraft was carrying 47 passengers and 5 crew members and had been on a scheduled flight from Kandahar to Farah. There were no survivors.

=== 1985: Aeroflot Antonov An-12 shootdown, Angola ===
On November 25, 1985, in Angola during the Angolan Civil War, an Aeroflot Antonov An-12 was shot down by a surface-to-air missile, while operating a cargo flight from Cuito Cuanavale to Luanda, allegedly by South African Special Forces; all 21 people on board were killed.

=== 1987: Bakhtar Afghan Airlines Antonov An-26, Afghanistan ===
On 11 June 1987, a Bakhtar Afghan Airlines Antonov An-26 (registered YA-BAL) was shot down by CIA-backed Afghan militants with a missile near Khost, killing 53 out of the 55 people on board. The aircraft had been on a flight from Kandahar to Kabul.

=== 1987: Zimex Aviation Lockheed L-100, Angola ===
On 14 October 1987, a Lockheed L-100 Hercules (registered HB-ILF), owned by the Swiss company Zimex Aviation and operated on behalf of the International Committee of the Red Cross (ICRC), was shot down about four minutes after departing Cuito airport, Angola. It was hit by an unknown projectile fired by unknown combatants during the Angolan Civil War. Four crew members and two passengers died. On the ground, two persons died and one was severely injured.

=== 1987: Air Malawi 7Q-YMB ===
On 6 November 1987, an Air Malawi Shorts Skyvan (registered 7Q-YMB) was shot down while on a domestic flight from Blantyre, Malawi to Lilongwe. The flight plan took it over Mozambique where the Mozambican Civil War was in progress. The aircraft was shot down near the Mozambican town of Ulongwe. The eight passengers and two crew on board died.

=== 1988: Iran Air Flight 655 ===
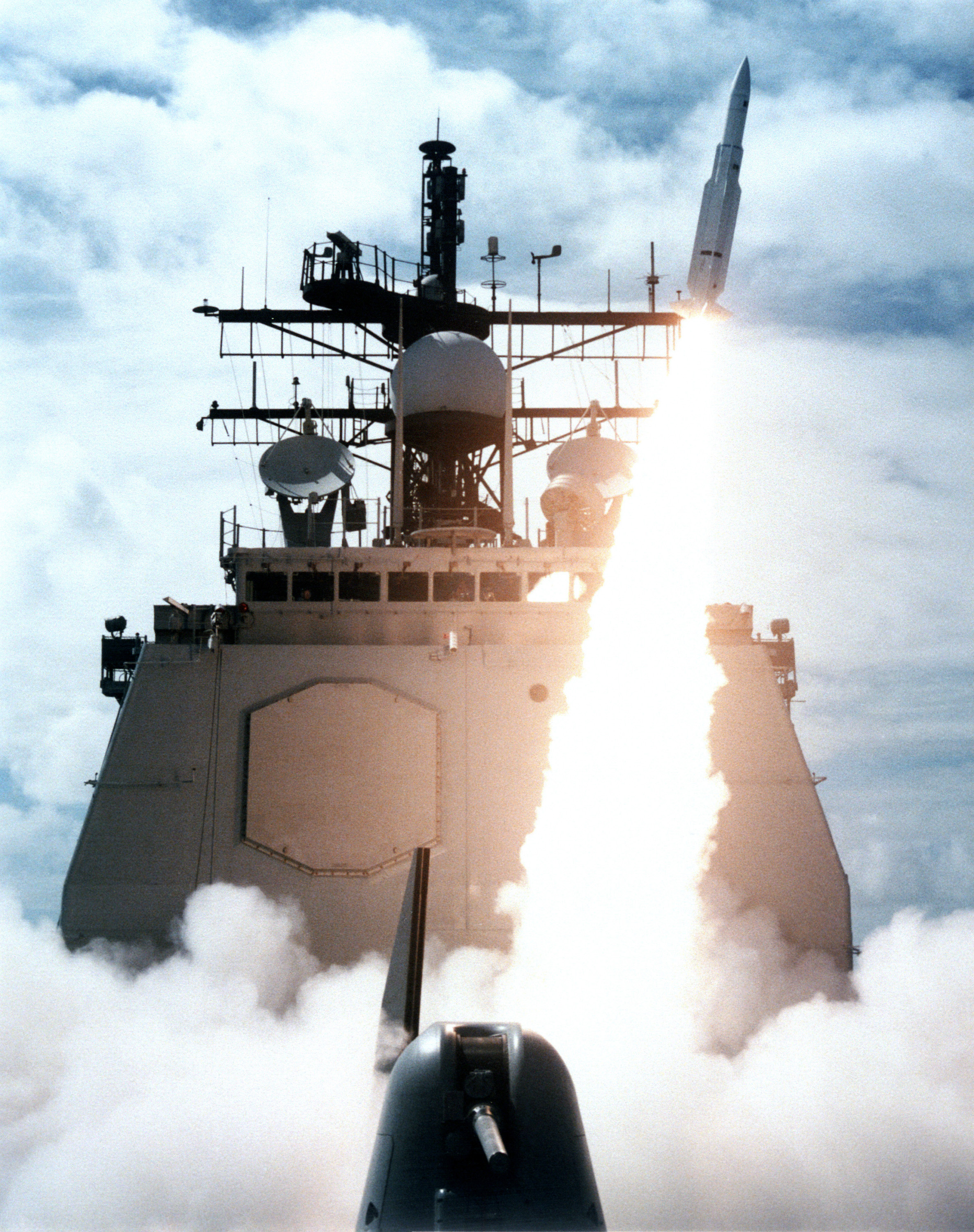
A missile departs the forward launcher of Vincennes during a 1987 exercise. The forward launcher was also used in the downing of Iran Air 655.

Iran Air Flight 655 was a commercial flight operated by Iran Air that regularly flew from Bandar Abbas, Iran to Dubai, UAE. On 3 July 1988 the aircraft was shot down by the U.S. Navy guided missile cruiser USS Vincennes which fired a RIM-66 Standard surface-to-air missile. The airplane was destroyed between Bandar Abbas and Dubai; all 290 passengers and crew died, including 66 children. USS Vincennes was in Iranian waters at the time of the attack. IR655, an Airbus A300 on an ascending flight path, was allegedly mistaken by Vincennes as a descending Iranian Grumman F-14 Tomcat.

=== 1988: Ariana Afghan Airlines shootdown ===
On 19 November 1988, an Antonov An-26 operated by Ariana Afghan Airlines was flying from Kabul, Afghanistan to Jalalabad, Afghanistan when the pilot became lost due to a technical issue. The aircraft entered Pakistani airspace when the pilot asked for help from a nearby airport in Pakistan. It was subsequently shot down by ground fire from the Pakistan Air Force near Parachinar, Pakistan resulting in 30 deaths. Ministry of Defence of Pakistan claimed that the aircraft was shot down by ground fire when it entered Pakistani territory and failed to identify itself.

=== 1988: T&G Aviation DC-7 ===
On 8 December 1988 a Douglas DC-7 chartered by the US Agency for International Development was shot down over Western Sahara by the Polisario Front, resulting in five deaths. Leaders of the movement said the plane was mistaken for a Moroccan Lockheed C-130. The aircraft was bound for Morocco for a locust control mission. A second aircraft was also hit, but managed to land at Sidi Ifni, Morocco.

== 1990s ==
=== 1992: Shooting of Armenian plane by the Azerbaijan military ===
A Yak-40 plane traveling from Stepanakert airport to Yerevan on 27 March 1992, with a total of 34 passengers and crew, was attacked by an Azerbaijani Air Force Sukhoi Su-25 attack aircraft. With an engine failure and a fire in rear of the plane, it eventually made a safe landing on Armenian territory.

=== 1993: Transair Georgian Airline shootdowns ===
In September 1993, two airliners belonging to Transair Georgia and a third belong to Orbi Georgia were shot down by missiles and gunfire in Sukhumi, Abkhazia, Georgia. The first, a Tupolev Tu-134, was shot down on 21 September 1993 by a missile during landing approach. The second plane, a Tupolev Tu-154, was shot down a day later also during approach. A third one was shelled and destroyed on the ground, while passengers were boarding.

=== 1994: Rwandan presidential airliner ===
The Dassault Falcon 50 airplane carrying Rwandan president Juvénal Habyarimana and Burundian president Cyprien Ntaryamira was shot down by surface-to-air-missiles as it prepared to land in Kigali, Rwanda, on 6 April 1994. Both presidents died. This double assassination was the catalyst for the Rwandan genocide and the First Congo War. Responsibility for the attack is disputed, with most theories proposing as suspects either the rebel Rwandan Patriotic Front (RPF) or government-aligned Hutu Power extremists opposed to negotiation with the RPF.

=== 1994: Accidental target tug shootdown by ROC Navy ===
On September 17, 1994, a civilian Learjet 35 operated by Golden Eagle Air Transport provided target tug operation in Han Kuang 11 military exercise for the Republic of China Navy off the coast of Taitung County, east to Taiwan. During the exercise, the navy frigate ROCN Cheng Kung was supposed to use its Phalanx CIWS to shoot down the target drone that's connected to the target tug Learjet via a 10,000 feet long cable. However, due to a series of human error, the CIWS locked on to the Learjet instead and promptly shot it down, killing all four on board.

=== 1998: Lionair Flight 602 ===
Lionair Flight 602, an Antonov An-24, crashed into the sea off the north-western coast of Sri Lanka on 29 September 1998. The aircraft departed Jaffna-Palaly Air Force Base on a flight to Colombo and disappeared from radar screens just after the pilot had reported depressurization. Initial reports indicated that the plane had been shot down by Liberation Tigers of Tamil Eelam rebels with a missile. All 7 crew and 48 passengers died.

=== 1998: Lignes Aériennes Congolaises crash ===
The 1998 Lignes Aériennes Congolaises crash occurred on October 10, 1998, when, shortly after take-off, a Lignes Aériennes Congolaises Boeing 727-30 flying from Kindu Airport to N'djili Airport, DR Congo was struck by a surface-to-air missile launched by rebel forces during the Second Congo War. The captain attempted an emergency landing, but the 727 crashed into a dense jungle near Kindu killing all 41 people on board.

=== 1999: Learjet 35A N350JF ===
A Learjet 35A registered as N350JF was operating a ferry flight with two flight crew from Naples, Italy to Lanseria, South Africa on 29 August 1999. It was flying from Luxor, Egypt to Nairobi, Kenya following a flight path that flew over Ethiopia. While flying over Eritrean airspace, flight crew did not follow the flight plan they filed before departure and continued flying on a closed airway. The airway, UG650 (now UM308), as well as the surrounding airspace was closed due to the ongoing Eritrean–Ethiopian War. Air traffic control in Asmara attempt to warn the crew of the safety risks associated with entering closed airspace without a clearance, but they did not change their path. After entering Ethiopian airspace, the Ethiopian Ground Forces shot a missile at the aircraft suspecting it to be an Eritrean aircraft attempting a bombing raid. The aircraft subsequently crashed near Adwa killing both crew members.

== 2000s ==
=== 2001: Peru shootdown ===
On 20 April 2001, a Cessna A185E floatplane (registered OB-1408) was shot down by a Peruvian Cessna A-37B Dragonfly attack aircraft over the border Mariscal Ramón Castilla Province of Peru. Two out of four passengers on board were killed, American Christian missionary Roni Bowers and her infant daughter Charity, while the pilot Kevin Donaldson was severely wounded. The incident took place during the Air Bridge Denial Program, where the floatplane was spotted by a CIA surveillance aircraft, who requested that the Peruvian Air Force follow the floatplane and force it to land at Iquitos to be searched for illegal drugs. After failing to contact the floatplane due to the message being sent on the wrong frequency, the CIA observers advised against a shootdown due to the floatplane not matching the expected behavior seen in drug trafficking aircraft, only for the Peruvian Dragonfly to open fire, downing the floatplane. A year later, the US government paid compensation of $8 million to the Bowers family and the pilot.

=== 2001: Siberia Airlines Flight 1812 ===
On 4 October 2001, Siberian Airlines Flight 1812, a Tupolev Tu-154, crashed over the Black Sea en route from Tel Aviv, Israel to Novosibirsk, Russia. Although the immediate suspicion was of a terrorist attack, American sources proved that the plane was hit by a S-200 surface-to-air missile, fired from the Crimean Peninsula during a joint Ukrainian-Russian military exercise, and this was confirmed by the Moscow-based Interstate Aviation Committee. All on board (66 passengers and 12 crew) died. The President of Ukraine Leonid Kuchma and several high commanders of the military expressed their condolences to the relatives of the victims. The Ukrainian Government paid out $200,000 in compensation to the families of every passenger and crew who died when the plane crashed; a total of $15 million in compensation for the accident.

=== 2003: Baghdad DHL attempted shootdown incident ===
On 22 November 2003, a DHL Airbus A300-200F cargo aircraft (registered OO-DLL) was struck on the left wing by a surface-to-air missile shortly after takeoff from Baghdad bound for Muharraq, Bahrain. The aircraft lost all hydraulic controls and the crew had to use engine thrust to maneuver. The pilots managed to return to Baghdad International Airport but lost directional control on landing, resulting in a runway excursion. All 3 people on board survived. The A300 did not fly again after the incident and was scrapped.

=== 2007: Balad aircraft crash ===
On 9 January 2007, an Antonov An-26 crashed while attempting a landing at Balad Air Base in Iraq. Officials claim the crash was caused by poor weather conditions, but other sources claim that this is a cover-up and the plane was actually shot down by a missile.

=== 2007: Mogadishu TransAVIAexport Airlines Ilyushin Il-76 crash ===
On 23 March 2007, a TransAVIAexport Airlines Ilyushin Il-76 airplane crashed in the outskirts of Mogadishu, Somalia, during the 2007 Battle of Mogadishu. Witnesses, including a Shabelle reporter, claimed they saw the plane being shot down, and Belarus initiated an anti-terrorist investigation, but Somalia insisted the crash was accidental. All 11 Belarusian civilians on board died.

== 2010s ==
=== 2014: Malaysia Airlines Flight 17 ===
Malaysia Airlines Flight 17 was a regularly scheduled flight from Amsterdam Schiphol Airport, Netherlands to Kuala Lumpur International Airport, Malaysia. On 17 July 2014, the Boeing 777-200ER (registered 9M-MRD) operating the flight was hit by a Soviet-made Buk surface-to-air missile fired by pro-Russian Donetsk separatists. All 283 passengers and 15 crew were killed, including 80 children. The Joint Investigation Team stated the missile was operated by Russian-backed rebels near Donetsk, Ukraine during the Battle in Shakhtarsk Raion. Russian President Vladimir Putin denied accusations of Russian involvement. At the time, the shootdown was Ukraine's deadliest aviation disaster and the deadliest aviation disaster involving the Boeing 777.

== 2020s ==
=== 2020: Ukraine International Airlines Flight 752 ===
Ukraine International Airlines Flight 752 was a scheduled international passenger flight from Tehran to Kyiv operated by Ukraine International Airlines. On 8 January 2020, the Boeing 737-800 (registered UR-PSR) operating the route was shot down by the Iranian Islamic Revolutionary Guard Corps (IRGC) shortly after takeoff from Tehran Imam Khomeini International Airport, killing all 176 people on board. After initially denying responsibility, Iran admitted on 11 January 2020 that, in the hours following the IRGC's launch of missiles against air bases used by the U.S., the plane was unintentionally targeted when the IRGC mistook it for a cruise missile launched by the U.S. in retaliation.

=== 2020: African Express Airways Brasilia crash ===
On 4 May 2020, an African Express Airways Embraer EMB 120 Brasilia on an air charter flight carrying pandemic relief supplies crashed on approach to an airstrip in Berdale, Somalia, after being fired upon by Ethiopian Ground Forces. All six people on board were killed. The incident is under investigation by the Somali government.

=== 2024: Azerbaijan Airlines Flight 8243 ===
On 25 December 2024, an Azerbaijan Airlines Embraer 190 (registered 4K-AZ65) crashed while attempting an emergency landing at Aktau International Airport, Kazakhstan. Azerbaijani officials told Reuters that preliminary results indicate the plane was struck by a Russian Pantsir-S air defence system. Associated Press subsequently reported that aviation experts believe it was likely shot at and struck by Russian air defences near its destination Grozny. The airliner was denied an emergency landing in Russia, and instead guided over the Caspian Sea. ADS-B data obtained by Flightradar24 showed the crippled aircraft experienced variable altitude of ±8,000 feet for at least 75 minutes, with photos from the crash site showing puncture damage to the vertical and horizontal stabilizers. Out of the 67 passengers and crew on board, 38 died, including both pilots.

=== 2025: IBM Airlines Boeing 737 incident ===
On 3 May 2025, a cargo Boeing 737-290C Advanced operated by IBM Airlines was destroyed at Nyala Airport by the Sudanese Armed Forces (SAF) during the Sudanese civil war. It was destroyed due to suspicions of carrying military weapons and supplies to the Rapid Support Forces (RSF). 54 out of 111 occupants on board the aircraft were killed. Reuters analyses showed that the aircraft was bombed at the tarmac.

=== 2025: Nyala Boeing 727 incident ===
On October 23, 2025, a Boeing 727-200 crashed while landing in Nyala. The plane veered off the side of the runway and caught fire, reportedly killing 19 people including both pilots and 17 passengers. The Sudanese army claimed to have shot down the plane and stated that it was transporting weapons.

=== 2026: Minembwe Antonov An-28 shootdown ===
On August 27, 2026, an Antonov An-28, arriving from Bukavu, was shot down on approach to Minembwe. At least four people on board were killed. It is unclear if the aircraft was on a military flight or on a civilian cargo flight.

== See also ==
- Arkia Israel Airlines Flight 582, a November 2002 flight that was the subject of an attempted shootdown with the missile missing the target
- Flight Guard, an antimissile defense mechanism for civilian aircraft
- List of aircraft hijackings
