= Bangladesh–Libya relations =

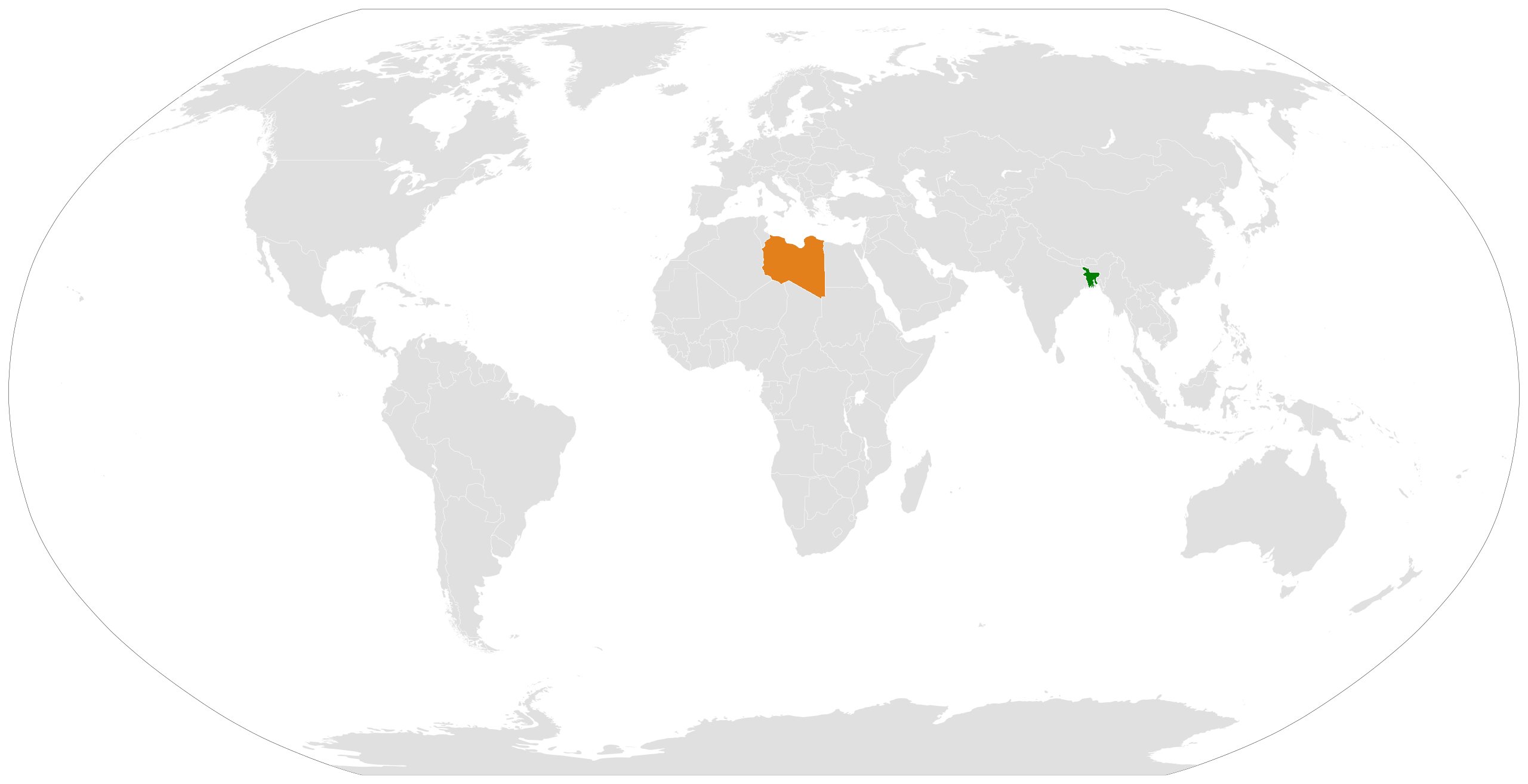

- Bangladesh: Libya

Bangladesh–Libya relations refer to the bilateral relations between Bangladesh and Libya. Bangladesh has an embassy in Tripoli. Libya has an embassy in Dhaka. Both countries are members of the Organisation of Islamic Cooperation.

== History ==
Libya is part of the Maghreb region. The 14th century traveller, Ibn Battuta, mentioned in his book the presence of Maghrebis in Bengal during that time, mostly as merchants. He speaks of a certain Muhammad al-Masmudi, who lived there with his wife and servant.

During the Bangladesh Liberation War of 1971, Libyan F-5s were deployed to Sargodha Airbase, perhaps as a potential training unit to prepare Pakistani pilots. Gaddafi personally wrote a strongly worded letter to Indian Prime Minister Indira Gandhi, an ally of the Bangladeshi Mukti Bahini, accusing her of aggression against Pakistan.

Major General Jamilud Din Ahsan was appointed ambassador of Bangladesh to Libya in September 2005.

== Modern relations ==
Bangladesh has a resident ambassador in Libya. Libya has a resident embassy in Dhaka, Bangladesh. In October 2011 the government of Bangladesh recognized the Libyan National Transitional Council. Bangladesh embassy was attacked in Tripoli in February 2017. In May 2020, 26 Bangladeshi migrants were murdered by human traffickers in the Mizdah massacre.

== Economic relations ==
Since 1974 Libya has been recruiting migrant workers from Bangladesh. Bangladesh signed an agreement to send 1 million workers to Libya in 2009. In May 2015 Libya banned migrant workers from Bangladesh over concerns that they were illegally migrating to Europe through Libya. There was an estimated 37,000-strong Bangladeshi community in Libya as of September 2015. By April 2017, the number had fallen to 20,000. In May 2017 Bangladesh became the single largest source of migrants to Europe through Libya. Khalifa Haftar of Libya's National Army banned the arrival of Bangladeshis and citizens of 5 other nations in 2017.

== See also ==
- Foreign relations of Bangladesh
- Foreign relations of Libya
- Africa–Bangladesh Business Forum
- Bangladesh-Africa Relations
- Bangladesh–South Africa relations
- Bangladesh–Morocco relations
