= Bangladesh–Mauritius relations =

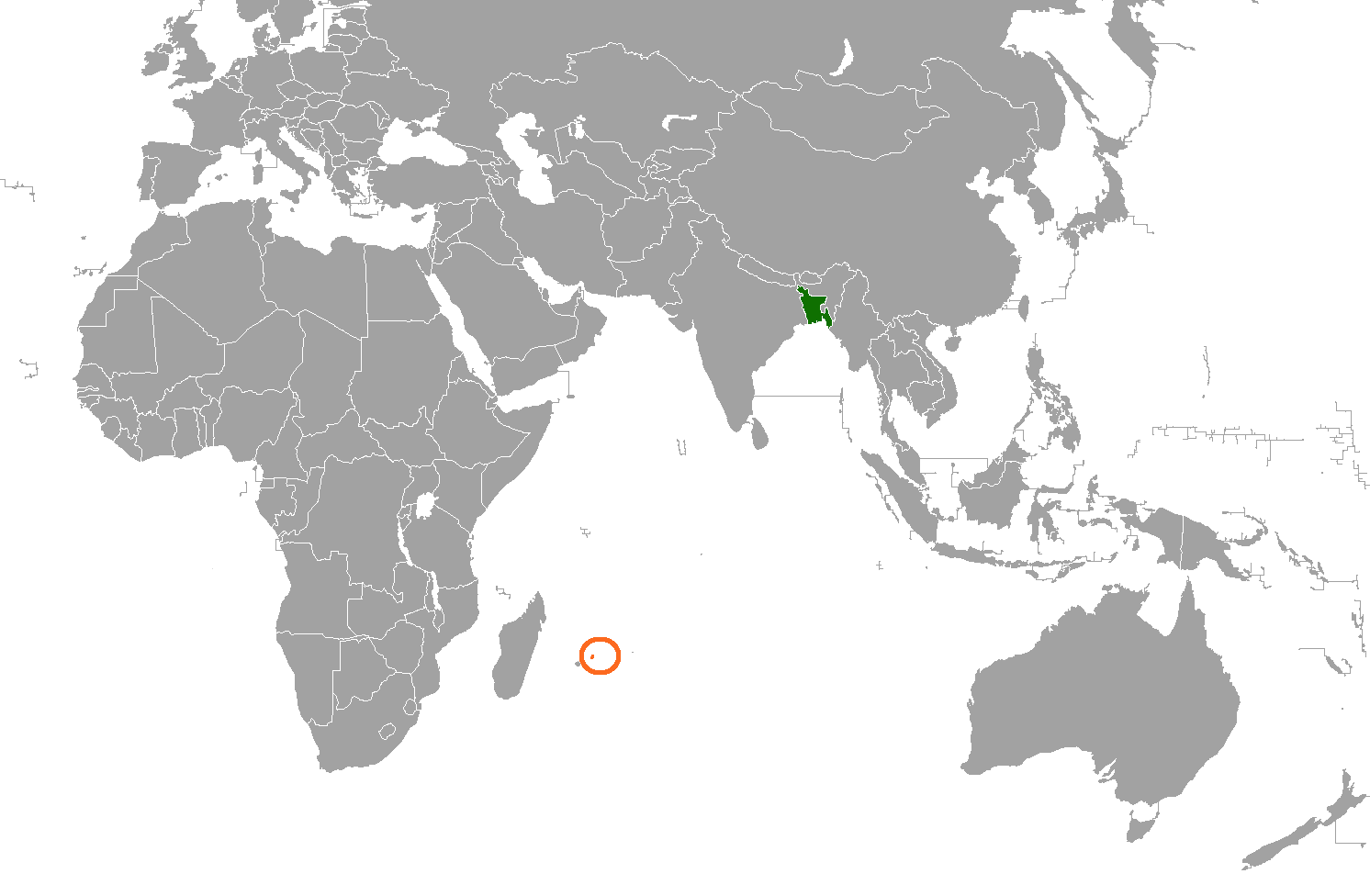

- Bangladesh: Mauritius

Bangladesh–Mauritius relations refer to the bilateral relations between Bangladesh and Mauritius. Bangladesh has an embassy in Port Louis. Mauritius has a non resident ambassador in New Delhi.

== History ==
The first account of a Bengali in Mauritius was in 1765 by the Mughal Empire diplomat I'tisam-ud-Din. Following this, Mirza Abu Taleb Khan, who later visited Europe in the closing years of the 18th century, had noticed that Bengali sailors had settled in Maldives.

Mauritius recognised Bangladesh's independence on 20 February 1972.

== High level visits ==
In 1978, former Mauritius Prime Minister Sir Seewoosagur Ramgoolam paid an official visit to Dhaka. Former foreign minister of Mauritius Jaya Krishna Cuttaree visited Dhaka in 2005. In 2009, former Bangladesh Foreign Minister Dipu Moni paid an official visit to Port Louis and held meetings with Mauritius Prime Minister Navinchandra Ramgoolam, Vice-Prime Minister Ramakrishna Sithanen, Minister for Finance and Economic Empowerment, Arvin Boolell, Foreign Minister, Jean Francois Chaumiere and Minister for Labour, International Relations and Employment Dharambeer Gokhool.

== Cooperation in work related migration ==
Mauritius has sought to recruit manpower from Bangladesh

== Economic cooperation ==
Bangladesh and Mauritius have shown their interest to expand the bilateral economic activities between the two countries and have been taking necessary steps in this regard. In 2013, a 7-member Bangladeshi delegation led by former commerce minister G M Quader paid a visit to Mauritius to initiate talks on Preferential Trade Agreement with Mauritius. Bangladeshi garments and handicrafts are potential products in the Mauritian market. Mauritius is also a significant destination for manpower export of Bangladesh. In 2005, Bangladesh has signed an MoU with Mauritius to formulise the existing cooperation in the field of manpower export to Mauritius. Bangladesh also exports pharmaceutical medicine to Mauritius.

== Bangladeshi diaspora ==
According to the 2022 census, there are 14,982 Bangladeshi expatriates living in Mauritius representing 1.21% of the total resident population.

== See also ==
- Foreign relations of Bangladesh
- Foreign relations of Mauritius
- Africa–Bangladesh Business Forum
- Bangladesh-Africa Relations
- Foreign relations of Bangladesh
- Bangladesh–South Africa relations
- Bangladesh–Morocco relations
