= Bangladesh–Egypt relations =

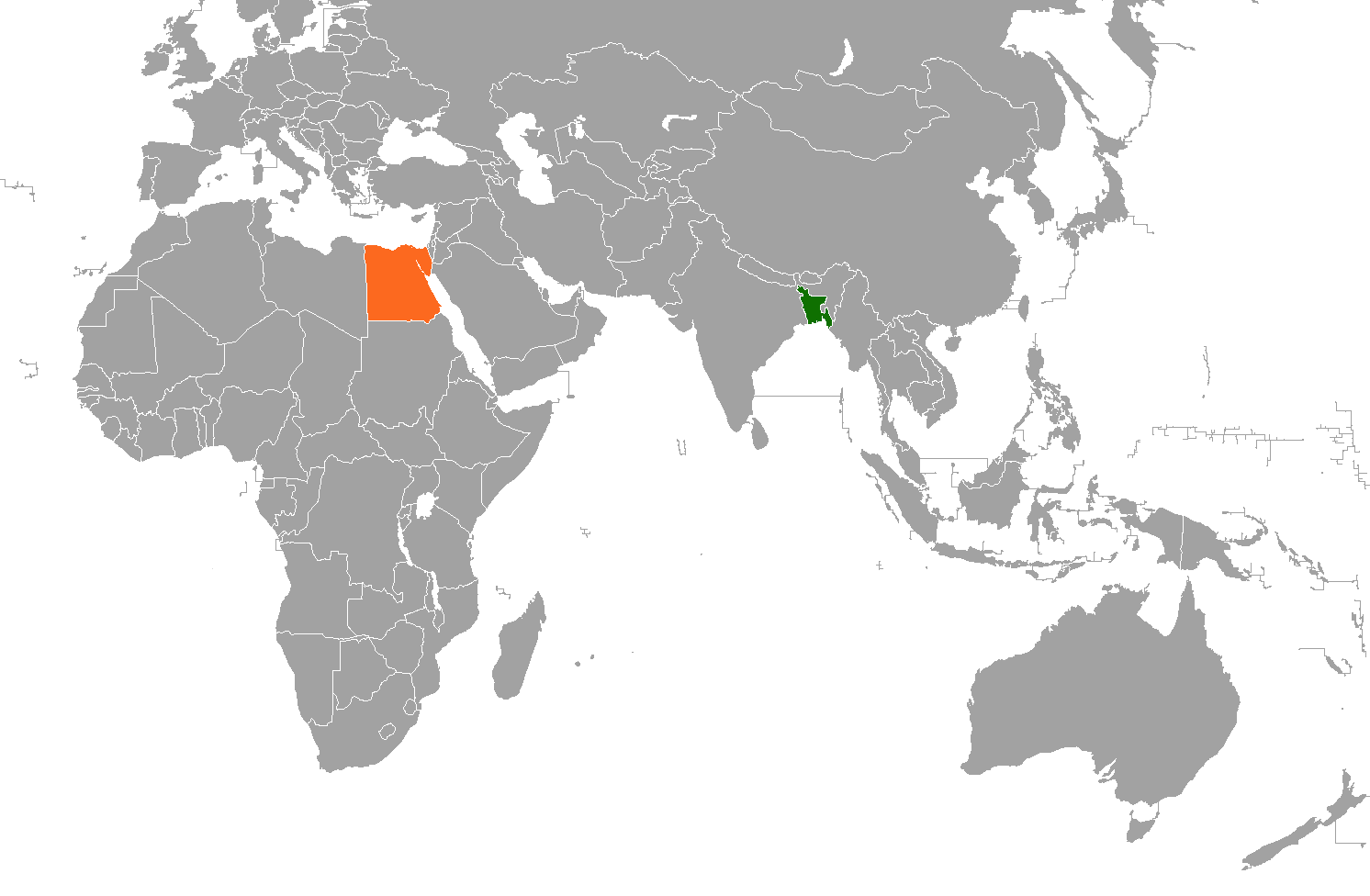

- Bangladesh: Egypt

Bangladesh–Egypt relations refer to the bilateral relations between Bangladesh and Egypt. Bangladesh and Egypt enjoy friendly relations. Egypt has a resident ambassador, Mahmoud Ezzat, in Dhaka, Bangladesh. Bangladesh's resident ambassador in Egypt is Samina Naz.

== History ==
=== Medieval ===
The Mamluk sultan Barsbay had good ties with other Muslim rulers of his time, in particular Jalaluddin Muhammad Shah, the Sultan of Bengal. According to Al-Sakhawi's Al-Daw al-lami` li ahli al-Qarni al-Tasi, the Mamluk sultan was once gifted by the Bengali sultan with investiture, a robe of honour and a letter of recognition. The Bengali ruler had died before his gifts could be dispatched to Barsbay. His son and successor, Shamsuddin Ahmad Shah, had slightly delayed the dispatching but nevertheless sending the initial gifts of his father off whilst also adding more gifts of his own. In total, the package was worth over 12,000 red tankas and included clothes, cotton, ginger, myrobalan and other spices. The envoy, travelling from Bengal to Cairo via the Indian Ocean, sank whilst at Jeddah's coast. In 1436, the Governor of Jeddah sent some men to search the Red Sea for the gifts and they came back with the textiles although the spices were damaged by the water. After Barsbay was informed of this by the governor, he ordered the arrest of all members of the Bengali embassy, the confiscation of their envoy's merchandise, and banned them from ever travelling to Cairo again.

=== Modern ===
Bangladesh sent medical teams and supplies to Egypt for the Yom Kippur War. In 1974 Egypt led by President Anwar Sadat donated 30 tanks to Bangladesh. These were the first tanks received by the Bangladesh Army after Bangladesh became an independent country in 1971. These same tanks were used in the assassination of Sheikh Mujibur Rahman. Bangladesh and Egypt are both members of the Organisation of Islamic Cooperation and the Islamic Military Coalition.

== Economic relations ==
Both Egypt and Bangladesh are members of the Developing-8. Bangladesh imports cotton from Egypt for its Ready-made garment industry. In 2005 Egyptian telecommunication company Orascom acquired Sheba Telecom the holding company of cellular company Banglalink. In 2013 there were 15 thousand Bangladeshis in Egypt according to the Bangladeshi embassy in Egypt.

== See also ==
- Africa–Bangladesh Business Forum
- Bangladesh-Africa Relations
- Foreign relations of Bangladesh
- Bangladesh–South Africa relations
- Bangladesh–Morocco relations
