= Bangladesh–Kenya relations =

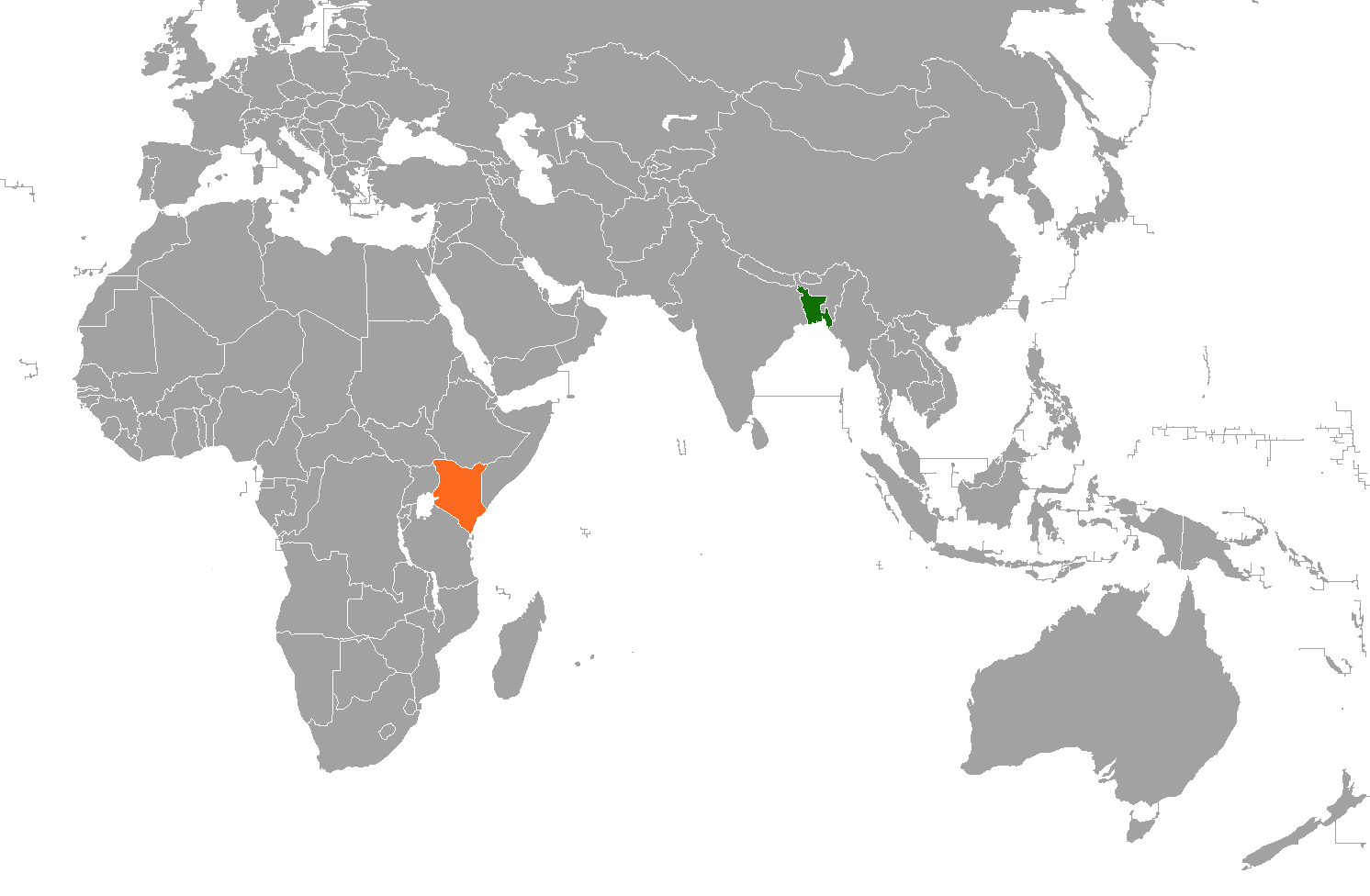

- Bangladesh: Kenya

Bangladesh–Kenya relations refer to the bilateral relations between Bangladesh and Kenya. Bangladesh has a high commission in Nairobi. Both countries are members of the Non-Aligned Movement, Group of 77, Commonwealth of Nations and the Indian-Ocean Rim Association.

== History ==
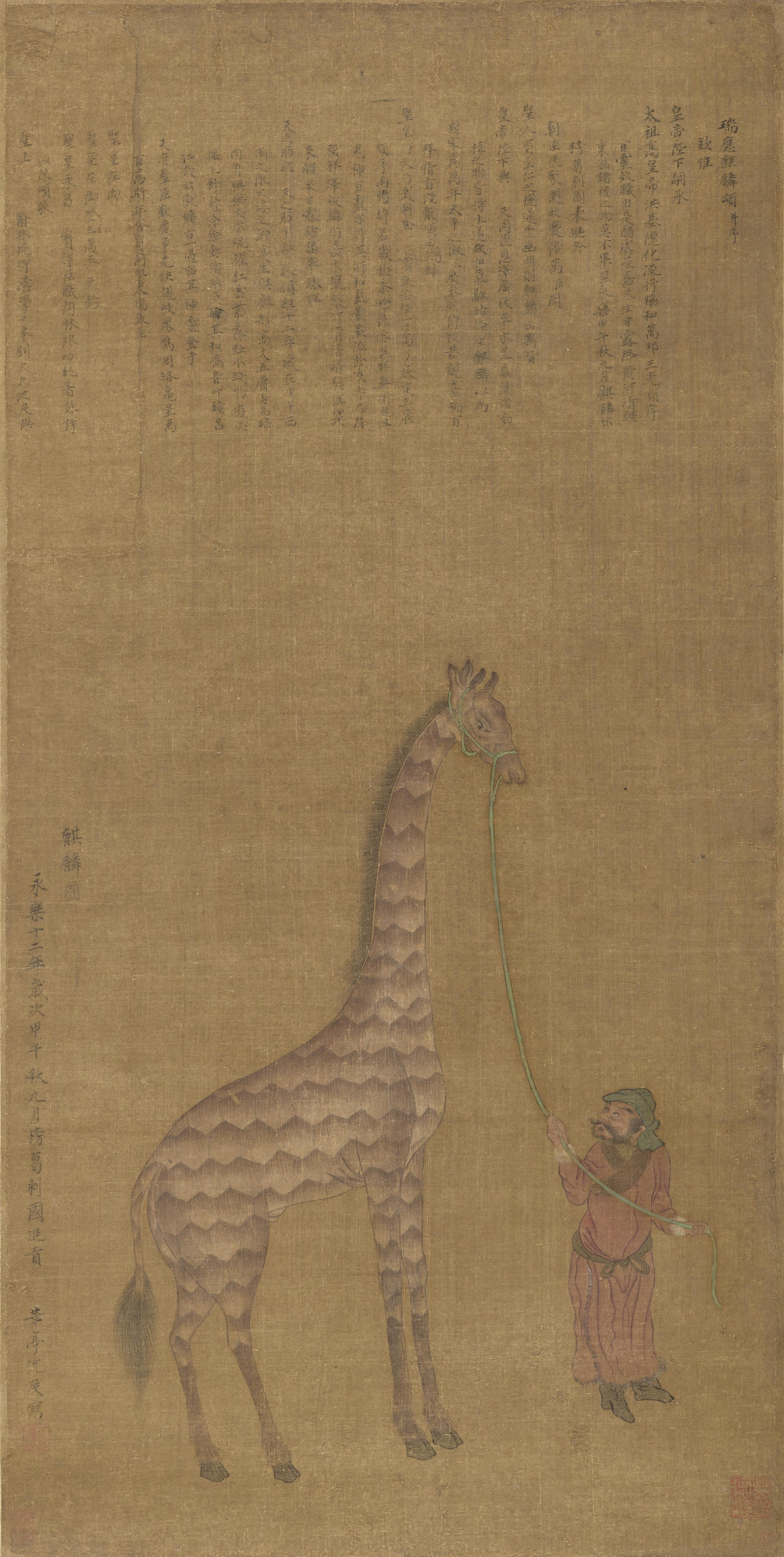
The Kenyan giraffe gifted by the Sultan of Bengal to China in 1414

Records exist of envoys from the Kenyan city-state of Malindi being hosted in the court of the Bengal Sultanate. Animals constituted a significant part of tributes in medieval Bengali courts. The Kenyan envoys brought giraffes, which were also noticed by the Chinese envoys in Bengal. Sultan Shihabuddin Bayazid Shah then gifted one of the Masai giraffes to Emperor Yongle of Ming China in 1414.

M. Wahidur Rahman, High Commissioner of Bangladesh to Kenya, was attacked by armed assailants on 22 February 2014.

In 2022, Kenya showed interest in signing G2G agreement and MoU between the two country's apex trade organizations alongside establishing direct flight to and from Dhaka.

== High level visits ==
Former Bangladesh Minister for Textiles and Jute, Abdul Latif Siddique paid an official visit to Nairobi in 2012.

In 2024, The 2nd Foreign Office Consultation (FOC) between Bangladesh and Kenya concluded in Nairobi, marking a significant milestone in the bilateral relations between the two countries.

== Agricultural cooperation ==
Kenya has been one of the desired destinations for Bangladesh to lease unused cultivable land in order to ensure future food security. Kenya has also expressed its interest to lease out vast arable lands to Bangladesh. The lands will be used to grow rice and cotton.

== Economic relations ==
Bangladesh and Kenya have shown mutual interest in expanding bilateral trade and investments. Jute is a major product that Bangladesh has been exporting to Kenya. Kenya has also been importing medicines from Bangladesh. In 2012, a Bangladeshi delegation led by the Minister for Textiles and Jute paid a visit to Nairobi and held talks with several trade bodies and ministries of Kenya to explore potential ways for increasing economic activities between the two countries. Bangladesh also exports pharmaceutical medicine to Mauritius.

In 2024, bilateral trade between Bangladesh and Kenya resulted in a $23.9 million trade surplus for Bangladesh. Bangladeshi exports to Kenya totaled $25 million, while imports from Kenya were valued at $1.09 million.

== See also ==
- Africa–Bangladesh Business Forum
- Bangladesh-Africa Relations
- Foreign relations of Bangladesh
- Bangladesh–South Africa relations
- Bangladesh–Morocco relations
