= Bangladesh–Sudan relations =

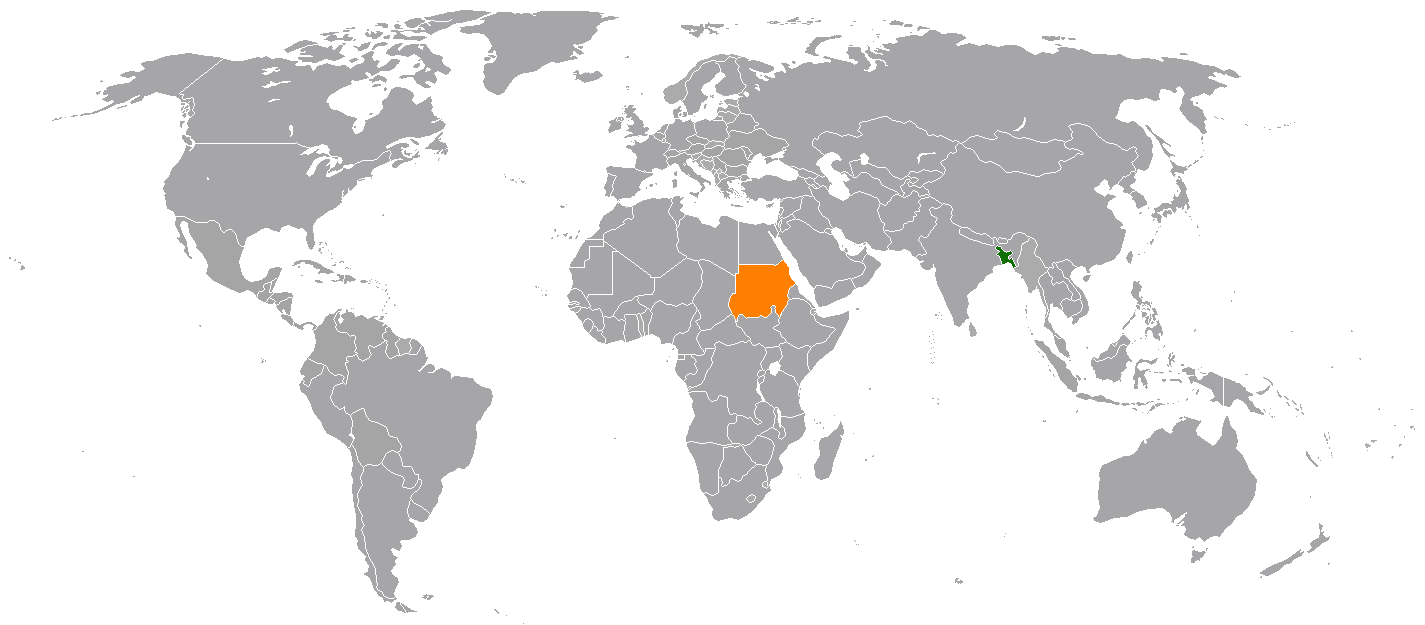

- Bangladesh: Sudan

Bangladesh–Sudan relations refers to the bilateral relations between Bangladesh and Sudan. Colleges in Bangladesh, like the Sher-e-Bangla Medical College, have hosted students from Sudan.

== High level visits ==
Mir Shawkat Ali was previously the Bangladeshi High Commissioner to Sudan. In 2008, former chairman of Joint Chiefs of Staff of Sudanese Armed Forces, General Muhammad Abdul Qadir Nasruddin paid an official visit to Dhaka.

== Military relations ==
A number of Sudanese soldiers have been participating in several training programmes in Bangladesh, specially in UN Peacekeeping training in Bangladesh Institute of Peace Support Operation Training.

== Economic relations ==
Both Bangladesh and Sudan have expressed mutual interest in expanding their bilateral trade and investment. Bangladeshi pharmaceuticals, ready made garments and ceramics have been identified as potential products in the Sudanese market. In 2008, Bangladesh and Sudan signed an agreement related to the importation of manpower. Prime Minister of Bangladesh Sheikh Hasina has taken the initiative of opening labour wing in the Bangladeshi Mission of Sudan. Bangladesh exports tea to Sudan.

== See also ==
- Africa–Bangladesh Business Forum
- Bangladesh-Africa Relations
- Foreign relations of Bangladesh
- Bangladesh–South Africa relations
- Bangladesh–Morocco relations
