= Bangladesh–Nigeria relations =

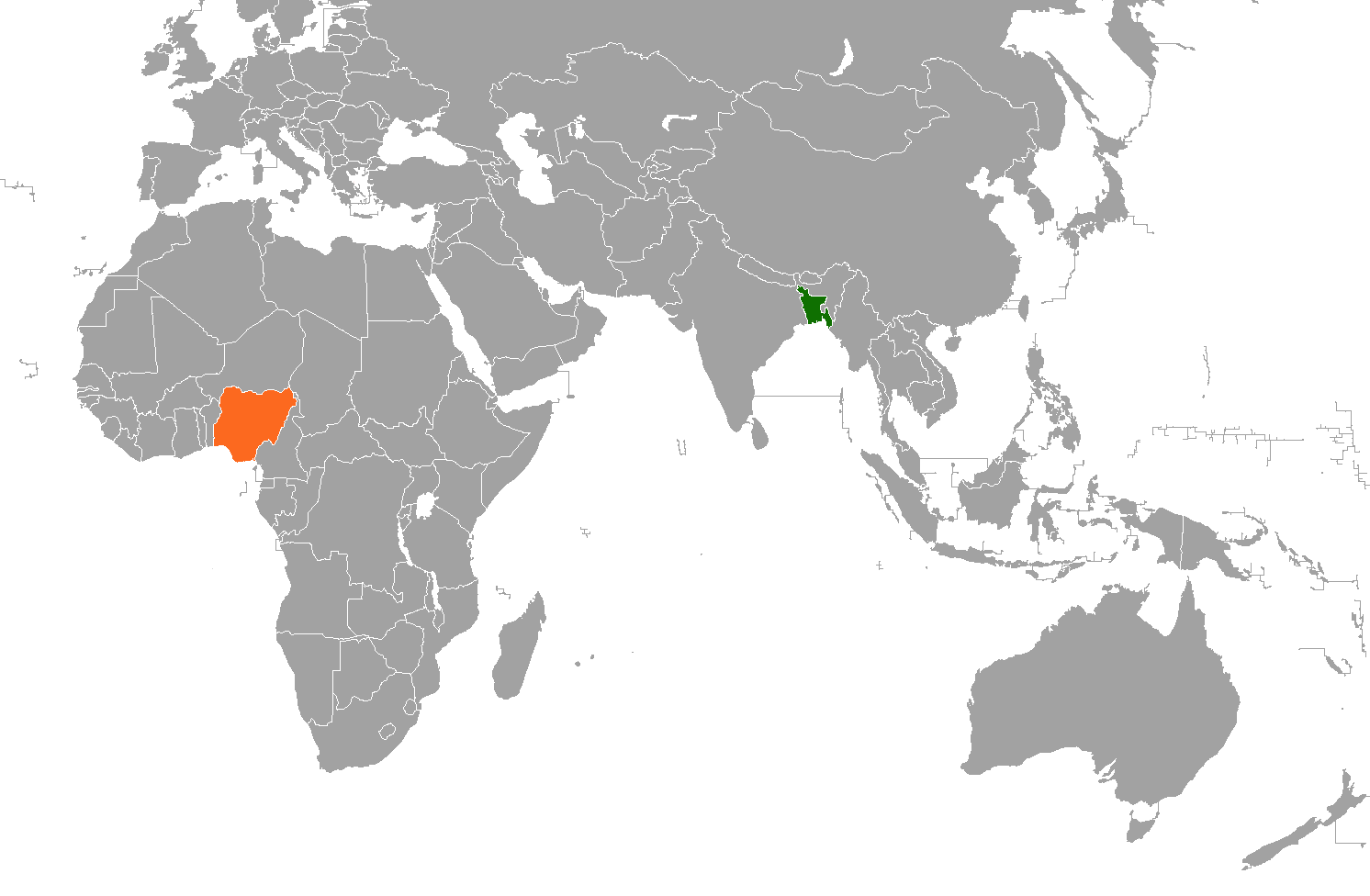

- Bangladesh: Nigeria

Bangladesh–Nigeria relations refer to the bilateral relations between Bangladesh and Nigeria. Bangladesh has a high commission in Abuja. Nigeria used to have a high commission in Dhaka, which is now closed. Nigeria is represented by a non-resident high commissioner in New Delhi. Both Bangladesh and Nigeria are members of international organizations including the Organisation of Islamic Cooperation, Commonwealth of Nations and Developing 8 Countries.

== High level visits ==
In 2010, Prime Minister of Bangladesh Sheikh Hasina paid an official visit to Abuja.

== Cooperation ==
Trade and investment, agriculture and tourism are chief areas for cooperation between the two countries.

== Economic relations ==
Bangladesh and Nigeria have expressed mutual interest to expand bilateral trade and investment. Bangladeshi pharmaceuticals, knitwear, cement, jute and jute goods, ceramics, ocean-going vessels, light engineering, leather and plastic goods have been identified as products with huge potential in the Nigerian market. Nigeria has urged Bangladeshi businessmen to invest in its agriculture, food-processing, pharmaceuticals, medical equipments, ICT and education sectors. Trade between the two countries stood at US$14 million in 2012. In 2014, Bangladesh Tariff Commission prepared a feasibility study for the benefits of signing new free/preferential trade agreements with African states and recommended Nigeria along with Mali as the most promising countries for signing such agreements.

== Sports ==
Nigerian footballer Eleta Kingsley is a known figure in Bangladesh club leagues. He was to be playing for Bangladesh national football team after getting Bangladeshi nationality, but could not due to non-approval from AFC.

== See also ==
- Foreign relations of Bangladesh
- Foreign relations of Nigeria
- Africa–Bangladesh Business Forum
- Bangladesh-Africa Relations
- Foreign relations of Bangladesh
- Bangladesh–South Africa relations
- Bangladesh–Morocco relations
