= Algeria–Bangladesh relations =

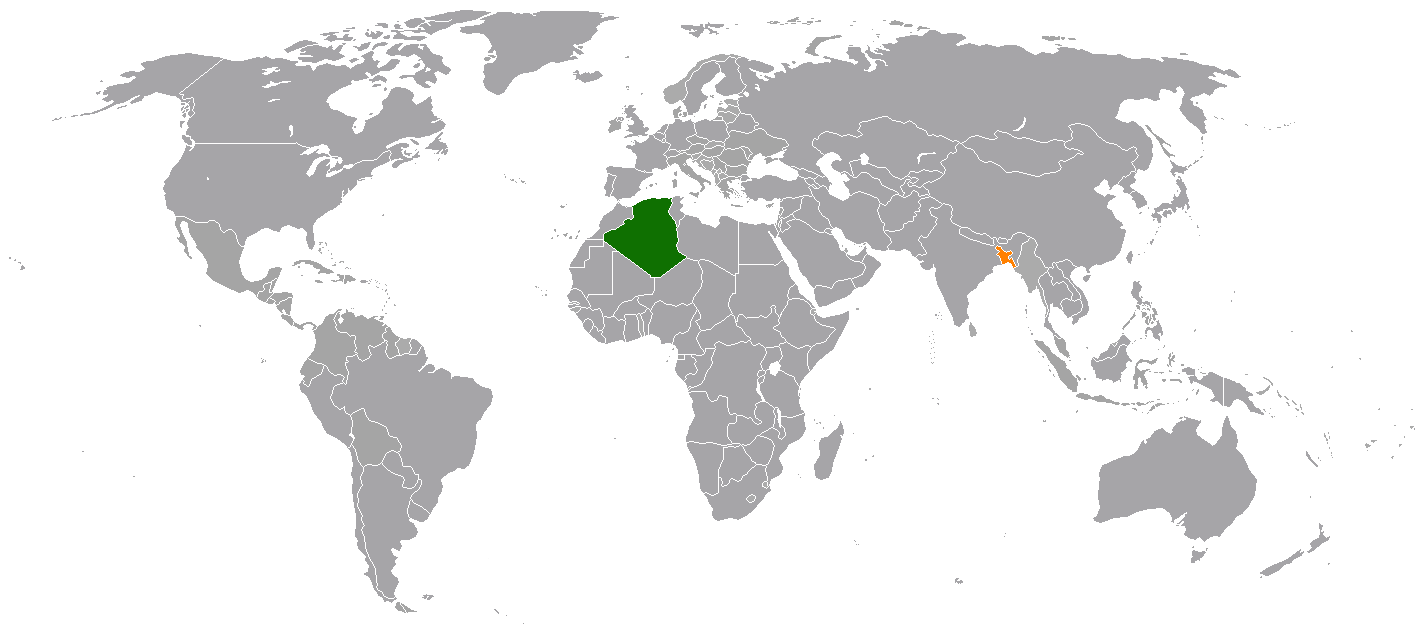

- Algeria: Bangladesh

Diplomatic mission
- Embassy of Algeria Dhaka, Bangladesh: Embassy of Bangladesh Algiers, Algeria

Envoy
- Algerian Ambassador to Bangladesh Rabah Larbi: Bangladeshi Ambassador to Algeria Muhammad Zulqar Nain

Algeria played a key role in Bangladesh's induction into the Organization of the Islamic Conference following the latter's independence from Pakistan in 1971. Algerian President Houari Boumediene traveled to Bangladesh to take Sheikh Mujibur Rahman on a special plane to the Islamic Summit in Lahore in 1974.

Algeria has an embassy in Dhaka and Bangladesh has one in Algiers.

== History ==
Algeria is part of the Maghreb region. The 14th century traveller, Ibn Battuta, mentioned in his book the presence of Maghrebis in Bengal during this time, mostly as merchants. He spoke of a certain Muhammad al-Masmudi, who lived there with his wife and servant.

=== Modern ===
Algeria was the first Arab country to recognize Bangladesh in 1971 after its independence. Relations further improved when Sheikh Mujibur Rahman became the first Bangladeshi head of state to visit Algiers in 1973 as part of a summit of the Non-Aligned Movement. In 1974, Algerian president Houari Boumediene paid an official visit to Dhaka. Algeria played a lead role in encouraging Bangladesh to join the Organization of the Islamic Conference in 1974. Algeria closed its embassy in Dhaka in 1990, reopening it three decades later, on 29 January 2020.

== Economic cooperation ==
Bangladesh and Algeria have shown interest in expanding the bilateral economic activities. Bangladeshi pharmaceuticals, melamine and leather goods have been identified as products with good potential in Algerian market. In 2007, a 20-member Bangladeshi business delegation along with chefs toured Algeria to find ways for increasing bilateral trade and investment between the two countries and to promote traditional Bangladeshi cuisine.

== Algerian Embassy ==
The Algerian embassy is located in Dhaka.

- Ambassador Rabah Larbi

== Bangladeshi Embassy ==
The Bangladeshi embassy is located in Algiers.

- Ambassador Muhammad Zulqar Nain.

== See also ==
- Africa–Bangladesh Business Forum
- Foreign relations of Bangladesh
- Bangladesh–South Africa relations
- Bangladesh–Morocco relations
- Bangladesh-Africa Relations
