= Kweilin incident =

1938 airliner shootdown incident

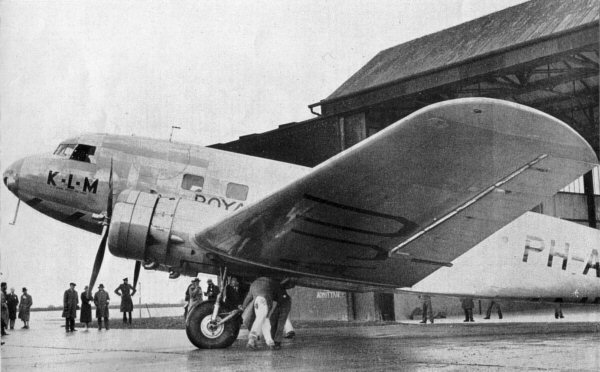
- A DC-2 passenger airliner similar to the Kweilin

Occurrence
- Date: August 24, 1938
- Summary: Strafing on the ground
- Site: Zhongshan, Guangdong, China; 22°31′01″N 113°23′35″E

Aircraft
- Aircraft type: Douglas DC-2
- Aircraft name: Kweilin
- Operator: China National Aviation Corporation
- Registration: 32
- Flight origin: Hong Kong
- 1st stopover: Wuzhou
- 2nd stopover: Chongqing
- Destination: Chengdu
- Occupants: 18
- Passengers: 14
- Crew: 4
- Fatalities: 15 (including two crew)
- Injuries: 1 (sole surviving passenger)
- Survivors: 3 (including two crew)

Kweilin incident
- Traditional Chinese: 桂林號事件
- Simplified Chinese: 桂林号事件
Transcriptions
Standard Mandarin
- Hanyu Pinyin: Guìlín hào shìjiàn
- Wade–Giles: Kuei-lin hao shih-chien
Yue: Cantonese
- Jyutping: gwai3 lam4 hou6 si6 gin6*2

The Kweilin incident occurred on 24 August 1938 when a Douglas DC-2 airliner named Kweilin carrying 18 passengers and crew was shot down by Japanese aircraft in China. There were fifteen fatalities including two crew. It was the first civilian airliner in history to be shot down by hostile aircraft. The pilot of the downed aircraft was American and the crew and passengers Chinese. As it was unprecedented for a civilian aircraft to be attacked, there was international diplomatic outrage over the incident. In the United States, it helped solidify the view that Japan was morally wrong in its war against China, however the incident was not enough to spur the United States into action against Japan despite Chinese entreaties. The Kweilin was rebuilt, renamed as the Chungking and destroyed by the Japanese army in a second attack two years later.

== Kweilin incident ==
DC-2 number 32 Kweilin (Note: Kweilin: 桂林號; 桂林号; Guìlín-hào; Kuei-lin hao) was owned by the China National Aviation Corporation (CNAC), one of the first commercial airlines in China. It was operated under contract by Pan American pilots and management who were mostly American in 1938. The plane was on a routine civilian passenger flight from the British colony of Hong Kong to Wuzhou, the first stop en route to Chongqing and Chengdu in Sichuan province. From Hong Kong, Chengdu was over 1,210 kilometres (750 miles) to the northwest. The flight had fourteen passengers, plus a steward, radio operator Joe Loh, (Note: Joe Loh: 羅昭明; 罗昭明; Luó Zhāomíng; Lo Chao-ming) copilot Lieu Chung-chuan, (Note: Lieu Chung-chuan: 劉崇佺; 刘崇佺; Liú Chóngquán; Liu Ch'ung-ch'üan) and American pilot Hugh Leslie Woods.

The Kweilin left Hong Kong at 8:04 am. At 8:30 am, soon after entering Chinese airspace, Woods spotted eight Japanese pontoon-fitted planes in what he believed to be an attacking formation. Woods took evasive maneuvers by circling into a cloud bank and was fired upon by the Japanese planes, their intentions made clear. As the DC-2 was unarmed, Woods put it into a fast dive to find a place to make an emergency landing, but the fields were rice paddies crisscrossed with dikes. Woods saw a river and made a perfect water landing with no injuries or damage; the plane was designed to float. However, Woods soon discovered he was the only person aboard who knew how to swim and the swift current bore the plane into full view of the circling Japanese planes. They began to strafe it with machine gun fire. Woods saw an unused boat on shore and swam to retrieve it. During the swim he was repeatedly strafed with machine gun fire but was not hit. On reaching shore, he saw the plane had drifted far down river and was so riddled with bullets it was sinking with only the tail and wing still visible. After about an hour of continuous attacks the Japanese planes left. Among the survivors were Woods, the radio operator Joe Loh and a wounded passenger, Lou Zhaonian. (Note: Lou Zhaonian: 樓兆念; 楼兆念; Lóu Zhàoniàn; Lou Chao-nien - also stated as "C. N. Lou") The dead included two women, a five-year-old boy and a baby. One victim had been hit thirteen times.

== Cause and effects ==
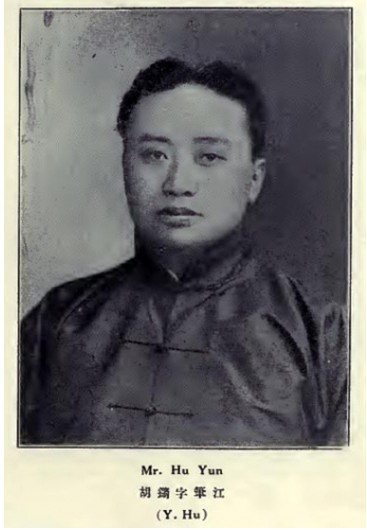
Hu Yun (Hu Bijiang), Chairman of the Bank of Communications, pictured in Who's Who in China, was killed in the incident

It was speculated that the reason for the attack was to assassinate Chinese President Sun Yat-sen's only son, Sun Fo, who was expected to be on the Kweilin. In fact Sun Fo had taken an earlier flight that day with a different airline, Eurasia. Sun Fo later claimed a secretary had made a mistake and had publicly announced the wrong flight. It was speculated that Sun Fo intentionally announced his departure on the wrong plane, in effect sacrificing the Kweilin so that his real flight could travel unmolested. While the Japanese government never officially acknowledged why or if they attacked the Kweilin, they said henceforth that while they took care they would not accept responsibility for civilian aircraft flying in a war zone. The Japanese Foreign Office claimed not to have fired on the aircraft but to have chased it as it was behaving suspiciously. A Japanese-language newspaper, The Hong Kong Nippo, admitted that although Sun Fo was the object of the attack, "our wild eagles intended to capture [him] alive."

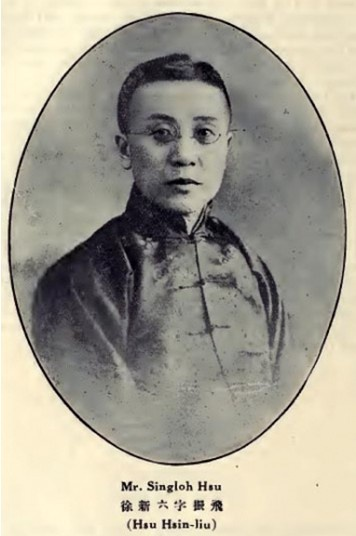
Xu Xinliu, General Manager of The National Commercial Bank, pictured in Who's Who in China, was killed in the incident

Three prominent Chinese bankers were among the passengers killed in the incident. They were Hu Yun (Hu Bijiang), Chairman of the Bank of Communications; Xu Xinliu, General Manager of The National Commercial Bank; and Wang Yumei, (Note: Wang Yumei: 王宇楣; Wáng Yǔméi; Wang² Yü³-mei²) an executive of the Central Bank of the Republic of China. Their deaths were a significant loss to the Chinese banking industry.

The incident was widely reported, due, in part, to its novelty as the first time a civilian airliner had ever been brought down by hostile aircraft. A popular newsreel, titled Kweilin Tragedy, showed to sell-out crowds for weeks in Hong Kong. It had an interview with Woods and showed the "mutilated airplane, scattered mail bags, and bullet-riddled corpses." After the incident, CNAC and other carriers began making night flights over China, using a new technology developed in Germany, "Lorenz", that allowed pilots to follow an auditory radio homing-beacon to the destination. There was diplomatic outrage over the incident. In the United States, it helped solidify the popular view the Japan was morally wrong in the war against China, but the incident was not enough to spur the US into action against Japan despite Chinese entreaties.

On 6 September an aircraft of the Sino-German Eurasian Aviation Company was attacked near Liuzhou by Japanese fighters while flying from Hong Kong to Yunnan. The company had already stopped flights to Hankou after the Kweilin attack.

== Kweilin restored as the Chungking ==
Chungking
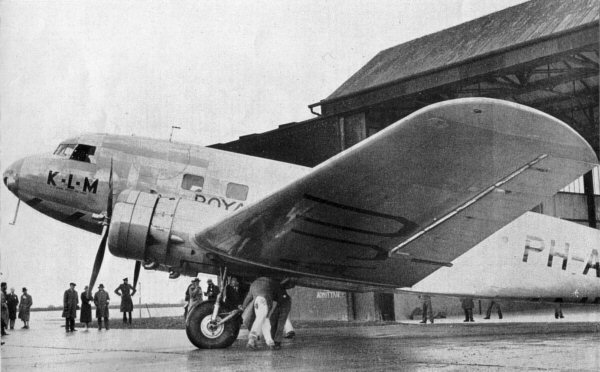
- A DC-2 passenger airliner similar to the Chungking

Occurrence
- Date: October 29, 1940
- Summary: Strafing on the ground
- Site: Zhanyi, Yunnan, China

Aircraft
- Aircraft type: Douglas DC-2
- Aircraft name: Chungking
- Operator: China National Aviation Corporation
- Registration: 39
- Flight origin: Chongqing
- Destination: Kunming
- Occupants: 14
- Passengers: 9
- Crew: 5
- Fatalities: 9 (3 crew/6 passengers)
- Survivors: 5

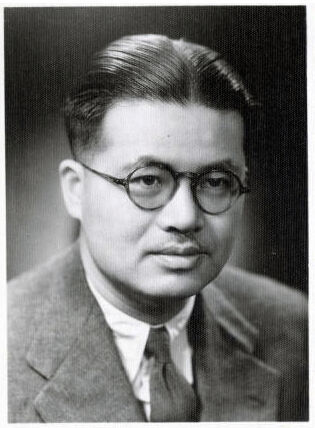
Architect and bridge engineer Chang-Kan Chien (Qian Changgan) was killed on board the Chungking

The Kweilin was retrieved from the river bottom, re-built, and put back into service as DC-2 number 39, the Chungking. (Note: Chungking: 重慶號; 重庆号; Chóngqìng-hào; Ch'ung-ch'ing-hao) Its former name was not advertised in order to assuage superstitious passengers who might not want to fly in an unlucky plane. On 29 October 1940, American pilot Walter "Foxie" Kent landed the Chungking at the rural Changyi Airfield in Yunnan with nine passengers and five crew including himself. Unknown to Kent, who was low on fuel, the airstrip had been attacked by five Japanese fighters minutes before and they were still circling nearby. The Japanese saw the DC-2 land and attacked it just as it rolled to a stop. The first bullet to enter the plane killed Kent instantly. The remaining passengers and crew tried to exit the plane but were either hit while inside or caught in the open while running across the airstrip. Nine were killed (three crew and six passengers). The Chungking then burst into flames and would never fly again. Unlike the unprecedented Kweilin incident two years earlier, attacks on commercial aircraft had become more common during the course of World War II. It received some local coverage for about a week but was not an international incident. For CNAC it was their second loss to a Japanese attack.

Chang-Kan Chien, (Note: Chang-Kan Chien: 錢昌淦; 钱昌淦; Qián Chānggàn; Ch'ien Ch'ang-kan) an American-educated Chinese architect and bridge engineer who oversaw the construction of a strategic bridge on the Burma Road, was among the passengers killed on the Chungking. After his death, the Chinese government named the bridge Changgan Bridge in his honor.
