= 2020 African Express Airways Embraer EMB 120 crash =

2020 aircraft crash in Somalia

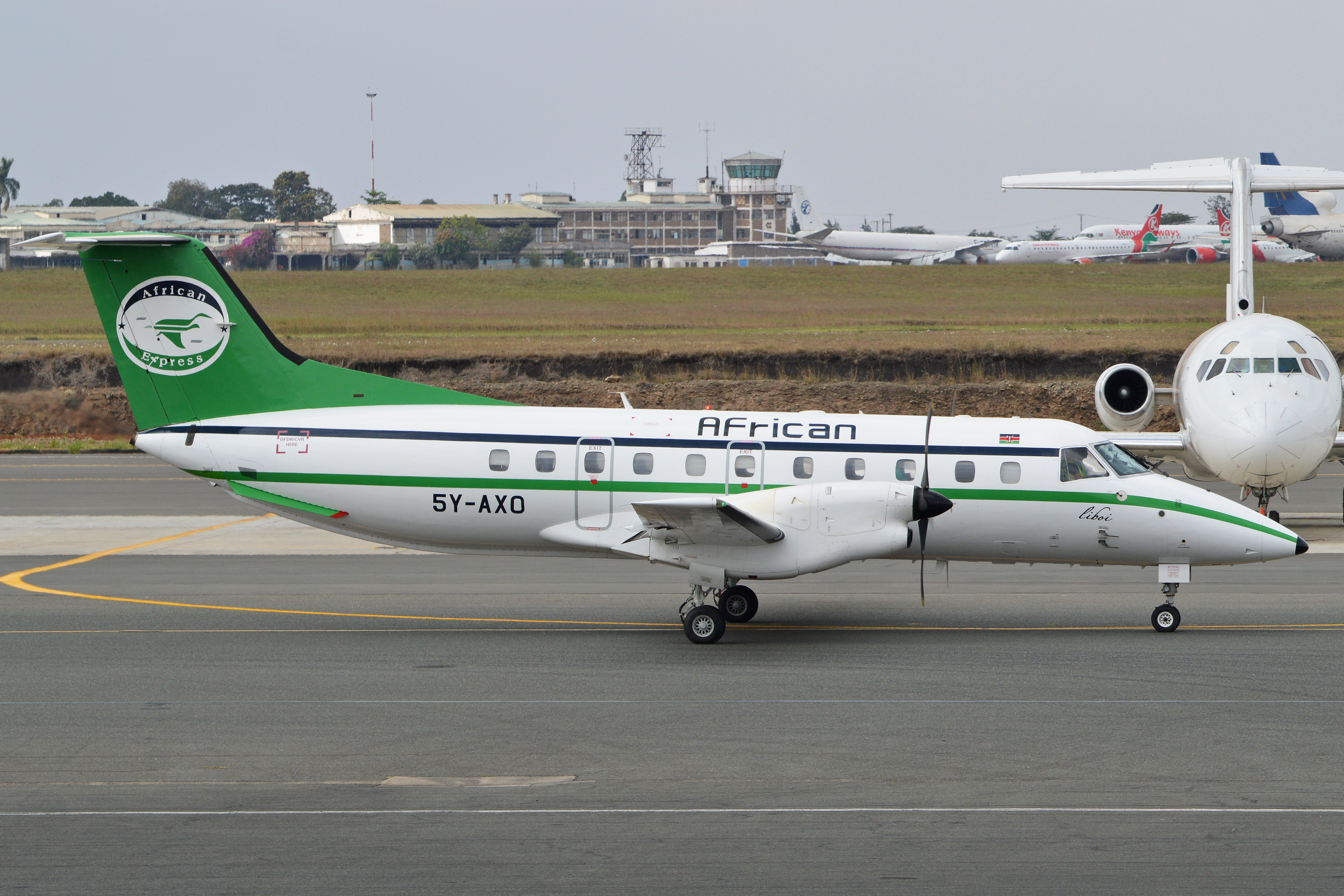
- 5Y-AXO, the aircraft involved, seen in 2014

Occurrence
- Date: 4 May 2020
- Summary: Allegedly shot down by Ethiopian National Defense Force
- Site: Berdale, Somalia; 3.21°N 43.17°E

Aircraft
- Aircraft type: Embraer EMB 120 Brasilia
- Operator: African Express Airways
- Registration: 5Y-AXO
- Flight origin: Baidoa Airport, Baidoa, Somalia
- Destination: Berdale Airfield, Berdale, Somalia
- Occupants: 6
- Passengers: 4
- Crew: 2
- Fatalities: 6
- Survivors: 0

The 2020 African Express Airways Embraer EMB 120 crash was an aviation accident involving an African Express Airways Embraer EMB 120 Brasilia that was on approach to Berdale on a chartered cargo flight from Baidoa Airport, Somalia on 4 May 2020 when it was allegedly shot down by ground troops of the Ethiopian National Defense Force. All 6 occupants, four non-revenue passengers and two crew, were killed. The plane was carrying medical supplies to assist with the COVID-19 pandemic in Somalia, as well as mosquito nets.

== Initial AMISOM report ==
According to a one-page African Union peacekeeping force incident report that was leaked on Twitter on 10 May, Ethiopian troops not affiliated with the peacekeeping mission fired on the aircraft because it made a non-standard approach from the west instead of the east, and it exhibited an irregular flight path, leading the troops to conclude that it may be engaged in a suicide attack; the report cited a "lack of communication and awareness" by the Ethiopian troops.

However, officials emphasized that the report contains readily apparent contradictions and factual errors, and Smaïl Chergui, the African Union Peace and Security Commissioner, said that the peacekeeping force lacks the expertise to conclusively determine the cause of the crash.

== Investigation ==
A joint accident investigation by officials from Somalia, Ethiopia and Kenya is underway, with preliminary findings expected in 45 days.

A preliminary report was presented by AMISOM on May 9, 2020, on which stated that Ethiopian troops in Berdale had admitted to having shot down the airplane by mistake. The troops at Berdale Airfield were not aware of the arrival of the airplane and they deemed the unusual flight path of the low-flying aircraft to be a potential suicide mission searching for a target to attack and therefore shot down the aircraft.

In addition to investigating the crash itself, Somali leaders questioned why Ethiopian troops outside the authority of the peacekeeping force were conducting armed operations in Somalia; there has been a history of controversial unauthorized incursions into Somalia by Ethiopian and Kenyan troops pursuing Al-Shabaab militants.

As of 2026, no official/final report has been released.

== See also ==
- List of aircraft shootdowns
