= Dakar International Forum on Peace and Security in Africa =

The Dakar International Forum on Peace and Security in Africa (French: Forum International de Dakar sur la Paix et la Sécurité en Afrique) or simply Dakar International Forum, is an international conference launched by the governments of France and Senegal in 2013 during the Elysée Summit. Held annually, it has brought together heads of state and governments, economic and industrial partners and representatives of civil society. The Forum is chaired by Senegalese President Macky Sall.

== Annual meetings ==
=== 2014 ===
The Forum took place on December 15 and 16, and brought together 350 participants in the presence of Presidents Macky Sall (Senegal), Idriss Déby Itno (Chad) and Mohamed Ould Abdelaziz (Mauritania). The discussions focused primarily on terrorism. Means to prevent it was highlighted by stakeholders including Smaïl Cherghi, the Peace and Security Commissioner of the African Union, and Hiroute Gebre Selassie, UN Special Envoy for the Sahel.

=== 2015 ===
The 2015 edition gathered 800 participants in November. Due to the regional context, the central issues were those of security, the fight against terrorism, the support of the international community for African security and mediation between the various states of the continent.

=== 2016 ===
The Dakar forum brought together around 1,000 people in 2016, including Nigerian president Muhamadu Buhari, Ibrahim Boubakar Keita of Mali, Faure Gnassingbé of Togo, and Filipe Nyusi of Mozambique. The French Minister of Defense, Jean-Yves Le Drian as well as Federica Mogherini, the High Representative of the European Union for Foreign Affairs and Security were also present. The main themes of that year were violent extremism and the management of African spaces.

=== 2017 ===
The theme of the 2017 conference was "Current security challenges in Africa: looking for integrated solutions." The primary objective was to foster a defense community in Africa and ensure that African countries themselves can take charge of security issues. Senegalese President Macky Sall said during the event: "I do not believe that the defense of Africa will be assured from the outside. Africa must take charge of its security."

This position was shared unanimously among the other political figures in attendance, including Presidents Ibrahim Boubacar Keïta (Mali) and Paul Kagame (Rwanda), as well as the Chadian Minister of Foreign Affairs Moussa Faki Mahamat. The event was furthermore attended by French Minister of the Armed Forces Florence Parly, and the Minister of Foreign Affairs, Jean-Yves Le Drian.

=== 2018 ===
That year's theme was "Peace and Security in Africa: issues of stability and sustainable development." The inauguration of the National School of Cybersecurity with a regional vocation took place during the forum. During the previous edition, Jean-Yves Le Drian underlined the need to "strengthen the capacities of African states to exercise their sovereignty over cyberspace." The region's security operations were prioritized on an equal footing with the development of the Sahel in the face of demographic, climatic and poverty challenges.

=== 2019 ===
The 2019 edition of the Forum was centered around the topic "Peace and Security in Africa: the current challenges of multilateralism." Expert panel discussions concerned the strategies of African states to tackle the threat of terrorism. Mauritanian President Mohamed Ould Ghazouani was the guest of honour.

=== 2021 ===
This edition will be held at the Abdou Diouf International Conference Center. Its theme is "The challenge of stability and emergence facing Africa in a post-Covid 19 world." The event will bring together heads of state (Mohamed Bazoum, President of the Republic of Niger, Cyril Ramaphosa, President of the Republic of South Africa, heads of government and leading ministers, such as Florence Parly.

Several topics will be addressed during the first part of the event such as health, youth, cybersecurity and development. The second part focuses on security cooperation among African nations, the fight against violent extremism, as well as the surveillance and control of maritime areas.

== Organization ==
Scientific direction is provided by the Center for Advanced Defense and Security Studies (CHEDS), a think tank affiliated with the Senegalese government.

Several public and private partners participate in the organization of the Forum, while institutional partners are France, Japan and China. Private sector partners include Airbus and Safran, among others.
