= Baidoa Airport =

Shatigadud International Airport Garoonka Caalamiga Diyaaradaha ee Shatigadud
- IATA: BIB; ICAO: HCMB

Summary
- Serves: Baidoa
- Location: Bay, Somalia
- Built: 1960s
- Elevation AMSL: 1,505 ft / 459 m
- Coordinates: 03°05.56′N 043°37.07′E

Map
- Location of airport in Somalia

Runways
Direction	Length		Surface
Direction	m	ft	Surface
04/22	2,940	9,646	Asphalt

Shatigadud International Airport Baidoa Somalia (IATA: BIB, ICAO: HCMB) is an airport serving Baidoa, the capital city of the Bay region in Somalia. It has been used by both civilian and military aircraft.

The airport was built in the 1960s, and at the time was 8,800 feet long and 150 feet wide, before being resurfaced with asphalt and lengthened to 9,600 feet in 1974 with Soviet support.

By June 1975 it was home to a squadron of at least 6 Somali Air Force Mig-21s, and 2 Il-28 bombers.

== Facilities ==
The airport resides at an elevation of 1,505 feet (459 m) above mean sea level. It has one runway designated 04/22 with an asphalt surface measuring 2,940 by 40 metres (9,646 ft × 131 ft) . The airport houses a large military compound built in 2014.

== Airlines and destinations ==
Airlines	Destinations
Jubba Airways	Mogadishu
