= Zhanyi Airport =

Zhanyi Airport 沾益机场
- IATA: none; ICAO: none

Summary
- Airport type: Public/Military
- Location: Zhanyi, Yunnan, China
- Coordinates: 25°35′32″N 103°49′43″E

Map
- Location of airport in Yunnan

Runways
Direction	Length		Surface
Direction	m	ft	Surface
00/18	1,524	5,000	Concrete

Zhanyi Airport
- Simplified Chinese: 沾益机场
- Traditional Chinese: 霑益機場
Transcriptions
Standard Mandarin
- Hanyu Pinyin: Zhānyì Jīchǎng
- Wade–Giles: Chan-i Chi-ch'ang

Zhanyi Airport (Chinese: 沾益机场) is a former civilian airport and military air base, located about 1 mile (1.6 km) southeast of Zhanyi, Yunnan Province in the People’s Republic of China.

== History ==
During World War II, the airport was known as Chanyi (Changyi) Airfield and was used by the United States Army Air Forces Fourteenth Air Force as part of the China Defensive Campaign. The airport primarily was a reconnaissance base, with photo mapping and combat aerial photography units flying combat mapping and photo flights over Japanese-held territory from September 1944 until September 1945. In addition, some B-25 Mitchell medium bomber and C-47 Skytrain transport aircraft used the airport. The Americans closed their facilities at the airport in early October 1945.

== Incidents ==
On October 29, 1940, the Chongqing was strafed by Japanese fighters after it landed. Of the 9 passengers and 3 crew, 7 passengers and 2 crew died.
