= Berdale =

Berdale Berdaali
- Town
- South West Flag
- Location in Somalia.
- Coordinates: 2.983333°N 44.283333°E
- Country: Somalia
- Region: Bay
- Time zone: UTC+3 (EAT)

Berdale (Maay: Berdaali, Somali: Berdaale) is a town in the southern Bay region of Somalia, in South West State of Somalia, and is also known as Bardale. It is the center of the Berdale District.

On 4 May, 2020, this was the site of an aircraft shootdown incident. A chartered cargo flight carrying medical supplies and mosquito nets, including supplies to assist in the coronavirus pandemic, was shot down by Ethiopian troops fearing a suicide attack.
