= Xu Xinliu =

Chinese banker

Xu Xinliu (Singloh Hsu)
- Chinese: 徐新六
Transcriptions
Standard Mandarin
- Hanyu Pinyin: Xú Xīnliù
- Wade–Giles: Hsü2 Hsin1-liu4

Xu Zhenfei
- Traditional Chinese: 徐振飛
- Simplified Chinese: 徐振飞
Transcriptions
Standard Mandarin
- Hanyu Pinyin: Xú Zhènfēi
- Wade–Giles: Hsü2 Chen4-fei1

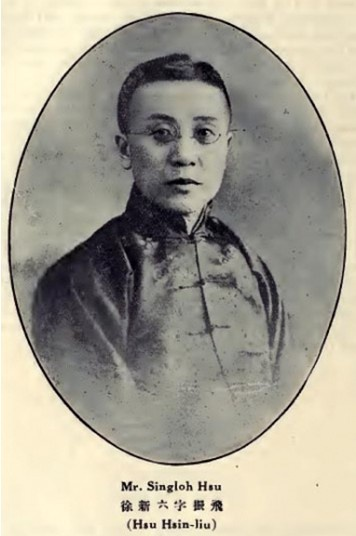
Xu Xinliu, photo from Who's Who in China

Xu Xinliu (Chinese: 徐新六, used Singloh Hsu as his English name in his lifetime, also known by the courtesy name Zhenfei, 1890 – 1938), was a Chinese banker. He was the general manager of the National Commercial Bank.

== Early life and education ==
He was born in Hangzhou, Zhejiang in 1890. He attended Yangzheng School, Hangzhou and then Nanyang Public School, Shanghai, and then University of Birmingham. In 1912 he was awarded a bachelor's of science degree from the last institution. He also attended institutions in Manchester, England, where he took business courses; and in Paris, where he took courses in finance.

== Career ==
In 1917, Xu Xinliu was serving as Secretary of the Ministry of Finance and twice assisted Liang Qichao in borrowing loans from Japanese businessmen. In November, Liang Qichao resigned angrily due to disagreements with Duan Qirui on the Sichuan Civil War. Xu Xinliu also left the Ministry of Finance and became treasury supervisor of the Bank of China.

In the same year, he went to Europe with Liang Qichao to inspect the political and economic conditions of various countries after the war, and was appointed as the Chinese representative of the Reparations Committee of the Paris Peace Conference (1919–1920) and a special member of the Chinese delegation.

Lin Yutang noted that Xu Xinliu read foreign books in their original languages, citing an example of him reading works by Anatole France.

Tao Menghe introduced Hu Shih to Xu Xinliu, and in turn, Xu Xinliu introduced Hu Shih to Liang Qichao. Later Xu Xinliu helped Hu Shih financially.

== Death ==
Xu Xinliu died in the Kweilin incident on 24 August 1938 at the age of 48.

== Personal life ==
He had a son, Ta-Chun (T.C.) Hsu (Note: Chinese: 徐大春; pinyin: Xú Dàchūn; Wade–Giles: Hsu^{2} Ta^{4}-ch'un^{1}). Ta-Chun moved to the United States in the 1950s.

== See also ==
- Hu Bijiang (a.k.a. Hu Yun), another banker who died in the Kweilin incident
