= Hu Bijiang =

Chinese banker

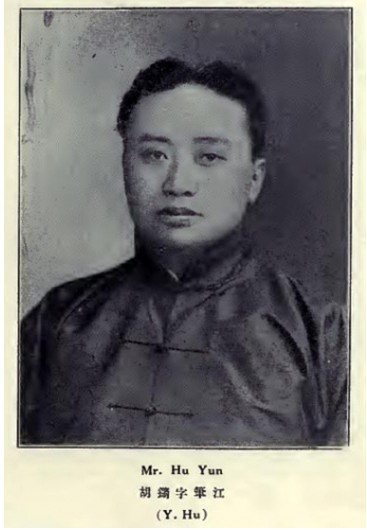
- Hu Yun, pictured in Who's Who in China
- Born: 1881; Qing China
- Died: 1938; Zhongshan, Guangdong, Republic of China (as part of the Kweilin incident)
- Other name: Hu Yun
- Occupation: Banker
- Known for: Chairman of the Bank of Communications

Hu Yun
- Chinese: 胡筠
Transcriptions
Standard Mandarin
- Hanyu Pinyin: Hú Yún
- Wade–Giles: Hu2 Yün2

Hu Bijiang
- Traditional Chinese: 胡筆江
- Simplified Chinese: 胡笔江
Transcriptions
Standard Mandarin
- Hanyu Pinyin: Hú Bǐjiāng
- Wade–Giles: Hu2 Pi3-chiang1

Hu Yun (Chinese: 胡筠), courtesy name Bijiang (Chinese: 筆江), (1881-1938) was a Chinese banker and former chairman of the Bank of Communications. History professor Parks Coble described him as one "of Shanghai's most prominent bankers" for that time.

He was born in 1881. At one time he managed a Bank of Communications branch, and he suggested to an acquaintance that he create a bank for Overseas Chinese people. Hu Yun later became the chairperson of the Bank of Communications.

He died in the Kweilin incident in 1938.

== See also ==
- Xu Xinliu - Another banker who died in the Kweilin incident
