= National Commercial Bank (China) =

Defunct Chinese bank

- Traditional Chinese: 浙江興業銀行
- Simplified Chinese: 浙江兴业银行
Transcriptions
Standard Mandarin
- Hanyu Pinyin: Zhèjiāng Xīngyè Yínháng

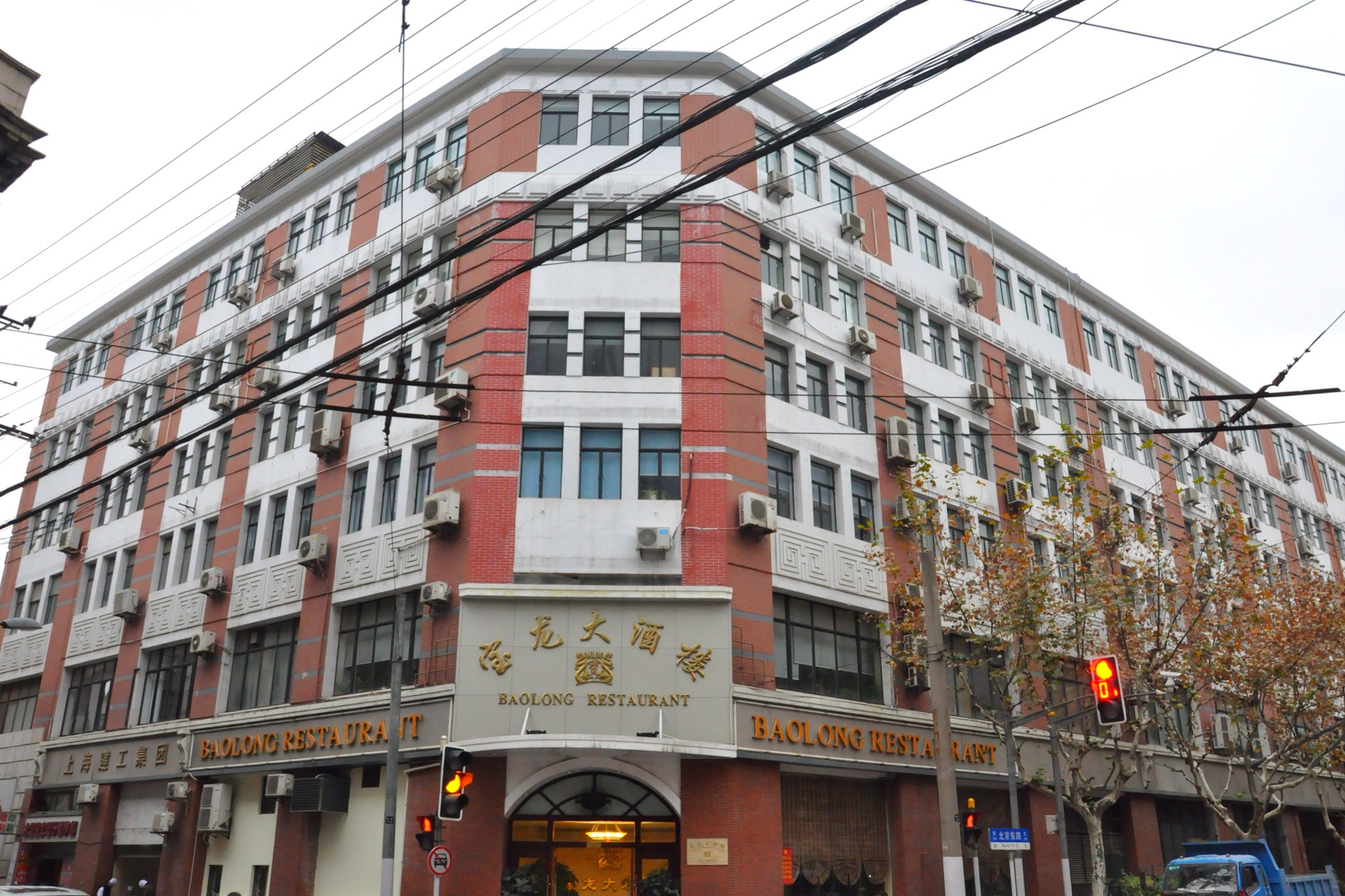
Former head office building in Shanghai

The National Commercial Bank Limited, also known as Zhejiang Xingye Bank (Chinese: 浙江興業銀行), was a Chinese bank considered one of the "Three Southern Banks" during nationalist government era. It was merged to Bank of China (Hong Kong) in 2001.

== History ==
- 1907: Founded in Hangzhou by Zhejiang Provincial Railway Company (Chinese: 浙江省鐵路公司).
- 1908: Opened its Shanghai branch.
- 1915: Moved headquarters to Shanghai.
- 1946: Established Hong Kong branches.
- 1980: Moved headquarters to Beijing.
- 1989: Became a wholly owned subsidiary of Bank of China Group.
- 2001: Merged to form Bank of China (Hong Kong).
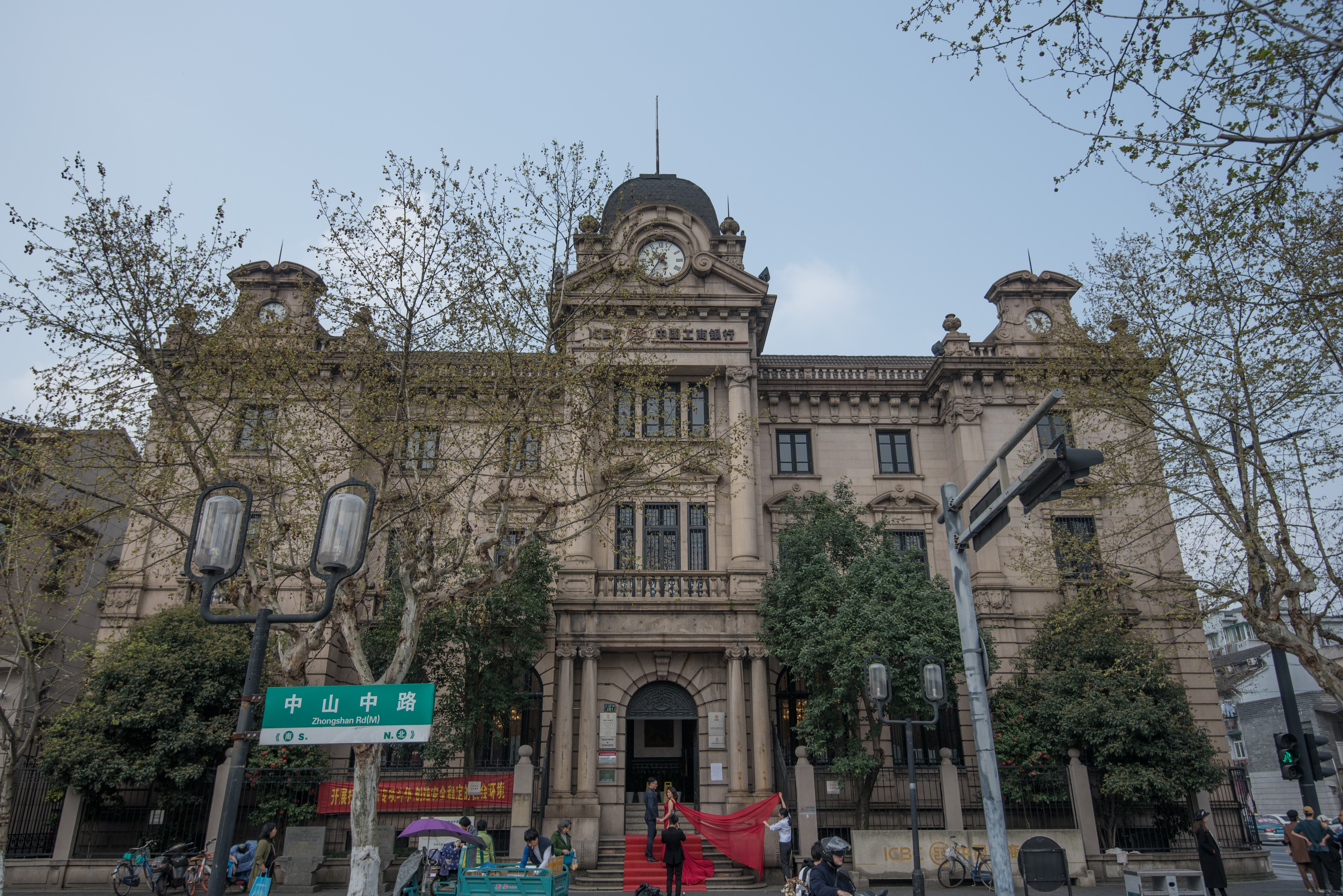
Former branch in Hangzhou

Former branch in Tianjin

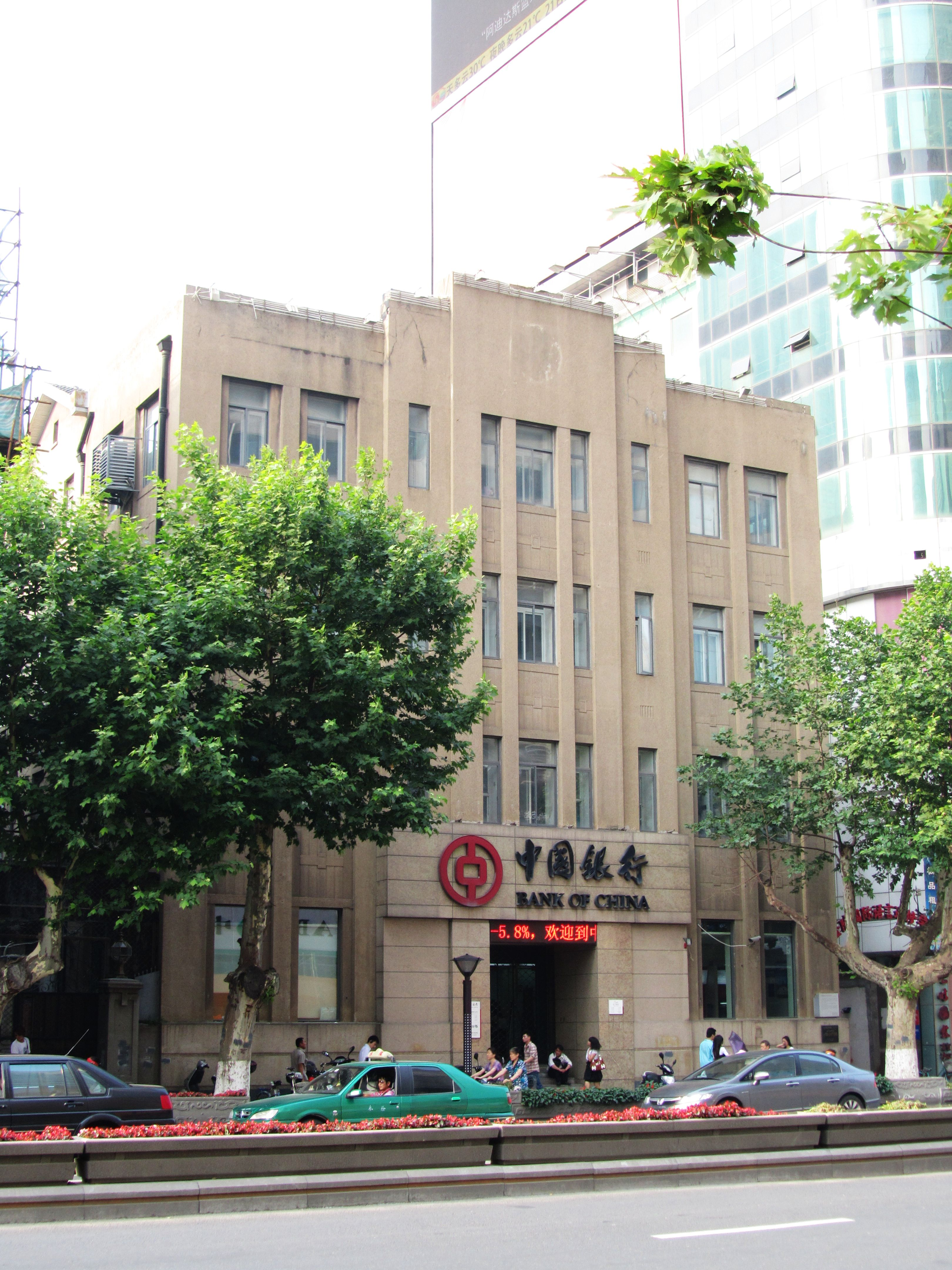
Former branch in Nanjing

== Notable staff ==
- Xu Xinliu (Singloh Hsu), general manager
