= Mizdah massacre =

- Location: Mizdah, Libya
- Date: May 27, 2020
- Attack type: Massacre
- Weapon: Guns
- Deaths: 30 (26 Bangladeshi and 4 African)
- Injuries: 1
- Perpetrator: Human Traffickers

The Mizdah massacre occurred on May 27, 2020, when 30 migrants in Mizdah in Southwest Libya were murdered by human traffickers. 11 migrants were also injured in the massacre. 26 of the migrants were from Bangladesh and four from various African countries.

== Incident ==
Libya has become a transit country for migrants seeking to enter Europe. 654 Bangladeshis illegally entered Europe through Libya from January to April 2020, according to the European Frontex agency. Migrants pay 10,000 euros to smugglers in Libya to reach Europe. On 27 May 2020, 30 migrants were shot and killed by human traffickers in Mizdah. 26 of the migrants were from Bangladesh and four from African countries. 36 Bangladeshi migrants were held hostage in the town of Mizdah for ransom by the human traffickers. The 26 Bangladeshis killed in the massacre were buried in Mizdah. The injured migrants received treatment at a hospital in Tripoli. According to the Government of National Accord, the migrants were killed by relatives of a human trafficker, who had been killed during an altercation with migrants after the trafficker demanded more money.

One Bangladeshi migrant, who survived the massacre, reported paying brokers in Bangladesh. The broker accompanied the migrant to Nepal, from there to Dubai, then from Dubai to Egypt, and then handed them over to Libyan traffickers at the Egypt-Libya border. The migrants were held in Mizdah and tortured for ransom from their family back in Bangladesh. The traffickers demanded 12,000 dollars from the family of migrants.

== Reaction ==
The European Union condemned the killing and reiterated its commitment towards the fight against human traffickers. Bangladesh called for a quick investigation of the massacre to bring the killers to justice.

Medecins Sans Frontieres called for the evacuation of all migrants from Libya, describing the country as unsafe.
