= Smaïl Chergui =

Algerian diplomat

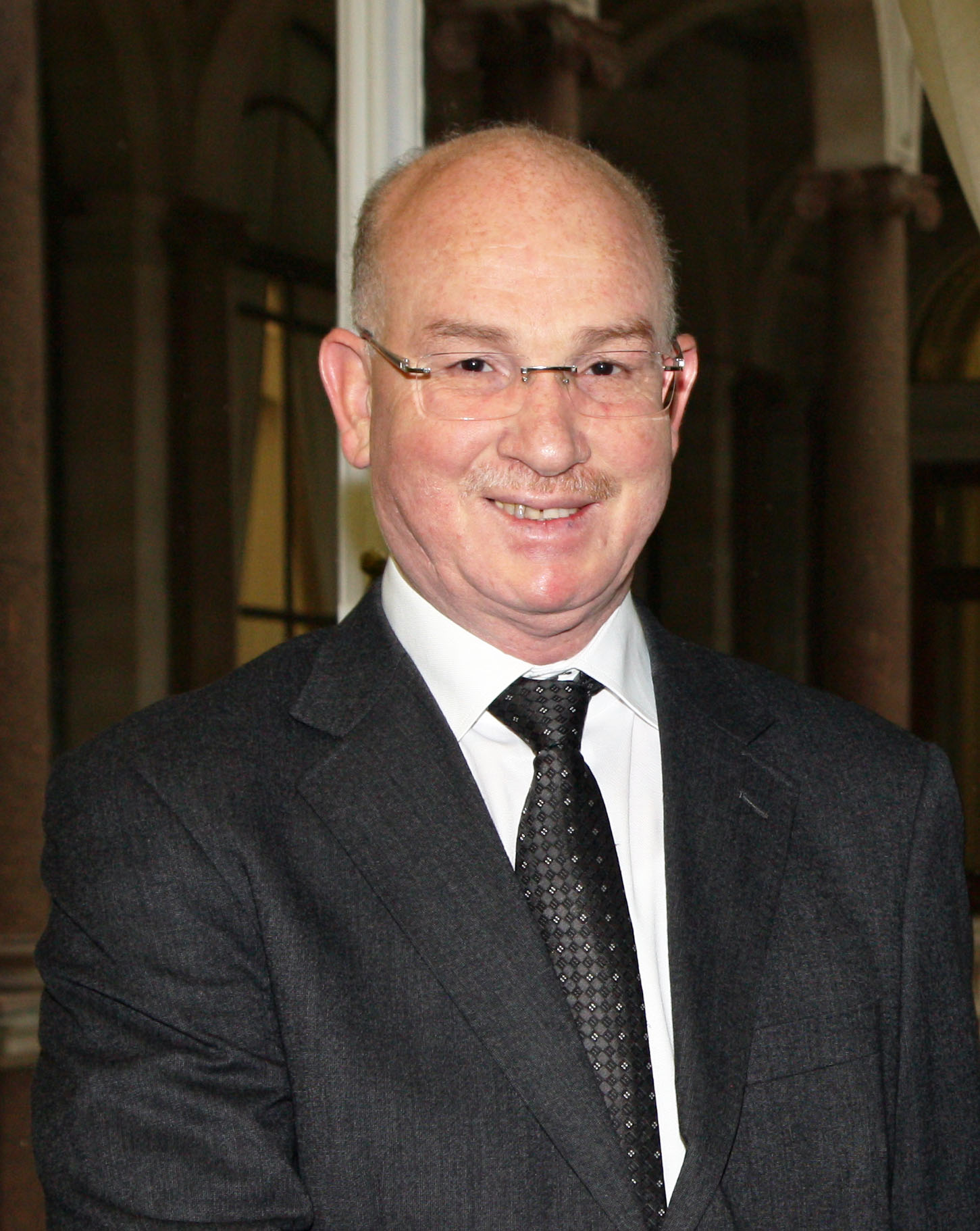
- Born: 4 September 1956 (age 69); Algeria

Smaïl Chergui (born 4 September 1956) is an Algerian diplomat and is the Ambassador Extraordinary and Plenipotentiary of the People's Democratic Republic of Algeria to the Russian Federation since December 2001.

Previous to his posting to Moscow, Chergui held positions as the Algerian Consul-General in Geneva and Ambassador to Ethiopia.

In 2013, he was elected as the African Union Commissioner for Peace and Security.
