= Eurasia Aviation Corporation =

- Founded: 1925
- Ceased operations: 1943
- Hubs: Kai Tak Airport
- Headquarters: Shanghai, China

Eurasia Aviation Corporation
- Traditional Chinese: 歐亞航空公司
- Simplified Chinese: 欧亚航空公司
Transcriptions
Standard Mandarin
- Hanyu Pinyin: Ōu Yà Hángkōnggōngsī
- Wade–Giles: Ou Ya Hang-k'ung Kung-ssu

Eurasia Aviation Corporation (Chinese: 歐亞航空公司) was a Chinese airline headquartered in Shanghai. The company had a Sino-German joint-venture with Deutsche Luft Hansa. Eurasia, classified as a state-owned airline by the Ministry of Communications of China, operated the Junkers W33 and, later, the three-engined Junkers Ju 52.The main fleet base was Hong Kong. When the Japanese began occupying portions of China in the late 1930s, the airline encountered difficulty.

On the day of the Pearl Harbor attack, about a dozen of Imperial Japanese Army Air Force's Ki-36 attack bombers from the 45th Sentai, escorted by nine Ki-27s from the 10th Dokuritsu Hikō Chutai led by Captain Akira Takatsuki, attacked Kai Tak airfield, Hong Kong, destroying many civilian and combat aircraft of the Commonwealth, the CNAC, and three Eurasia Aviation's Junkers 52/3m airliners; these were believed to have been aircraft ‘XIX’ (fmr. D-AGEI), ‘XXII’ (fmr. D-ABIZ) and ‘XXIV’ (fmr. D-AIMP). A fourth Junkers, believed to have been ‘XV’ (fmr. D-ANYK) was undamaged, as was a single Junkers W 34 ‘II’ (fmr. D-7).

== Routes ==
Routes included Shanghai-Lanzhou, Beiping (Beijing)-Henan, Liangzhou-Urumqi, and Shanghai-Manzhouli.

== Accidents and incidents ==
The following accidents and incidents occurred on Eurasia aircraft:

- Junkers Ju-52/3m XVIII crashed after engine failure in Kunming on 1 August 1937.
- Junkers Ju-52/3mge XXI crashed during a landing attempt in strong crosswinds in Wuhan on 16 July 1938.
- Junkers Ju-52/3mge XXIII Chiao T'ung 1 crashed into a mountain west of Guizhou near Weining on a passenger flight from Chongqing to Kunming on 12 March 1939. Four of the six occupants were killed.
- Junkers Ju-52/3m XVII Lanchow was destroyed while standing by fire after being strafed by Japanese fighters in Hanzhong on 6 May 1939.
- Junkers Ju-52/3mte XXV was attacked by three Japanese fighters on its delivery flight and forcibly landed in a rice field near Kunming where it was strafed and caught fire on 26 October 1940. Both occupants survived.
- Junkers Ju-52/3m XX was destroyed by a Japanese bombing while standing at Chengdu Airfield on 30 December 1940.
- Junkers Ju-52/3m XXII and Junkers Ju-52/3m XT-AGE were both destroyed while standing at Hong Kong-Kai Tak International Airport during a Japanese bombing on 8 December 1941.
- Junkers Ju-52/3m XT-ABE Suchow was destroyed while standing at Guilin during a Japanese air raid on 11 December 1941.

== See also ==
- China National Aviation Corporation
- Civil aviation in China
