= Bangladesh–South Africa relations =

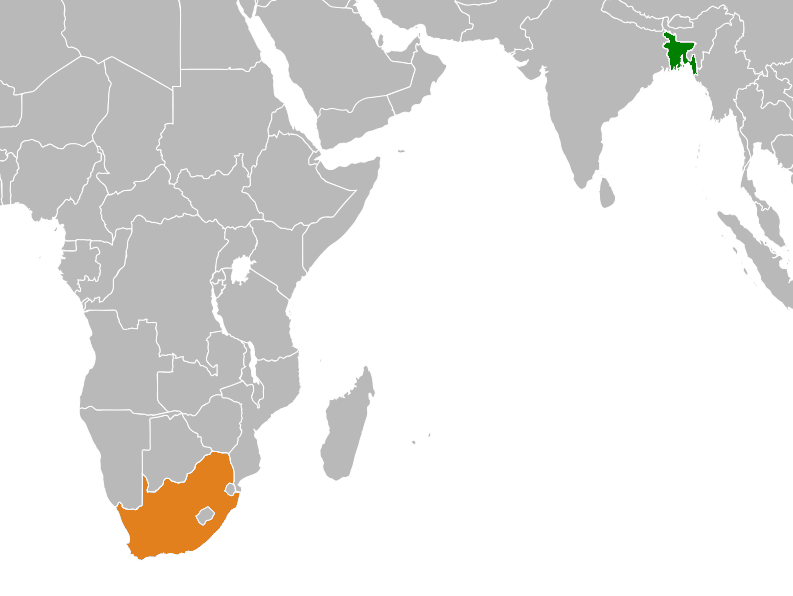

- Bangladesh: South Africa

Bangladeshis in South Africa
- (Bangladesh) (South Africa)

Total population
- 300,000

Regions with significant populations
- Johannesburg, Cape Town, Durban, East London, Port Elizabeth, Grahamstown

Languages
- Bangla · · English ·

Religion
- Islam

Related ethnic groups
- Bangladeshi diaspora

Bangladesh–South Africa relations refer to the bilateral relations between Bangladesh and South Africa. Bangladesh has a High Commission in Pretoria. The South African High Commission in Colombo is accredited to Bangladesh. Both countries are members of the Commonwealth of Nations.

== History ==
Bangladesh banned its citizens from going to South Africa before the end of apartheid. Bangladesh established ties with South Africa after the election of Nelson Mandela and the end of apartheid. The Minister of foreign affairs of Bangladesh attended the inauguration of Nelson Mandela as the President of South Africa. On 10 September 1994 the two nations established formal diplomatic ties. Bangladesh High Commission was opened on 27 February 1995 in Pretoria, South Africa. As of 2015, South Africa, Kenya, Mauritius and Sudan were the only Sub-Saharan African countries that had Bangladeshi diplomatic missions.

== Economic ==
There has not been much imbalance in the value of bilateral exports. In 2014, South African exports to Bangladesh were worth 852 million rand. Bangladesh exports to South Africa were worth 745 million rand.

== Migration ==
There are about 300,000 (2020) Bangladeshis in South Africa. The majority of whom are asylum seekers. Many Bangladeshis have set up shops there.

== See also ==
- Africa–Bangladesh Business Forum
- Bangladesh-Africa Relations
- Foreign relations of Bangladesh
- Bangladesh–Morocco relations
