= Bangladesh–Morocco relations =

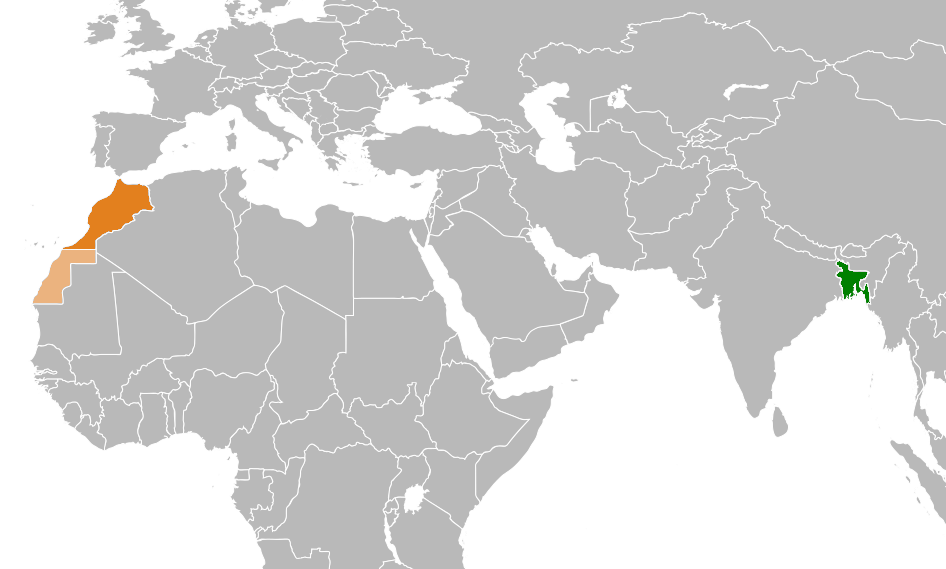

- Bangladesh: Morocco

Bangladesh–Morocco relations refer to the bilateral relations between Bangladesh and Morocco. Bangladesh has an embassy in Rabat and Morocco has one in Dhaka. Both countries are members of the Organisation of Islamic Cooperation, Group of 77, Non-Aligned Movement and United Nations.

== History ==
The 14th century traveller, Ibn Battuta, spent a few months in Bengal exploring the Port of Chittagong and meeting with Shah Jalal of Sylhet. Being on good terms with the Sultan of Delhi, Battuta avoided meeting with the Sultan of Bengal Fakhruddin Mubarak Shah who was in open rebellion against the Delhi Sultanate although he referred to him as an "eminent man, kind to strangers and the poor". He has mentioned in his book that there were Maghrebis living in Bengal during this time, mostly as merchants. He speaks of a certain Muhammad al-Masmudi, who lived there with his wife and servant.

=== Modern ===
On 13 July 1973, Morocco recognised Bangladesh as an independent nation. On 11 December 1988, Morocco opened its embassy in Dhaka, Bangladesh and on 28 August 1990 Bangladesh opened its embassy in Rabat, Morocco.

== High level visits ==
Prime Minister of Bangladesh, Sheikh Hasina, visited Morocco in 2016.

== Economic relations ==
Bangladesh exported goods worth 4.4 million dollars and imported goods worth 148 million dollars to Morocco.

== See also ==
- Foreign relations of Bangladesh
- Foreign relations of Morocco
- Africa–Bangladesh Business Forum
- Bangladesh–Africa relations
- Bangladesh–South Africa relations
