= Bangladesh–Africa relations =

- Bangladesh: AU

Diplomatic mission
- Algiers (Embassy); Cairo (Embassy); Addis Ababa (Embassy); Nairobi (High Commission); Tripoli (Embassy); Rabat (Embassy); Abuja (High Commission); Pretoria (High Commission): Dhaka (High Commission of South Africa); Dhaka (Embassy of Egypt); Dhaka (Embassy of Morocco); Dhaka (Embassy of Algeria); Dhaka (Embassy of Libya); Dhaka (Embassy of Kenya); Dhaka (Embassy of Nigeria); Dhaka (Embassy of Sudan); Dhaka (Embassy of Zimbabwe)

Envoy

Relations between the People's Republic of Bangladesh and the continent of Africa extends to bilateral, political, economic and multilateral ties. While individual African countries maintain separate diplomatic missions and bilateral relations with Bangladesh, Dhaka has pursued a more coordinated "Look Africa" policy since the mid‑2010s, aiming to deepen trade, investment, and diplomatic cooperation with the continent as a whole.

== History ==
Bangladesh and Africa share a long history of cooperation, particularly through United Nations peacekeeping missions, where Bangladeshi peacekeepers have served in several African countries, notably Mali, the Democratic Republic of the Congo, South Sudan and Sudan. In the 1980s, Bangladeshi president Ziaur Rahman undertook high‑profile visits to Morocco (1980) and Senegal (1981), laying early diplomatic groundwork.

After a long period of slow progress, in the 2010s, Bangladesh began a more systematic approach to Africa, often called the "Look Africa" policy. The Bangladesh Institute of International and Strategic Studies (BIISS) published a comprehensive volume in February 2025, titled Look Africa: Exploring New Horizons for Bangladesh, which argued for a deeper economic, diplomatic and knowledge partnership between Bangladesh and African economies.

=== Recent developments ===
In April 2026, Bangladesh's state minister for foreign affairs Shama Obaed led a delegation to the Dakar International Forum on Peace and Security in Africa, where she held bilateral meetings with the foreign ministers of Guinea, The Gambia, Mali, Niger, Angola and Senegal. During the meeting with Senegalese foreign minister Cheikh Niang, both sides agreed to hold Foreign Office Consultations and to explore opening resident diplomatic missions in each other's capitals.

In May 2026, Bangladesh and Morocco agreed to deepen bilateral cooperation in trade, investment, agriculture, skills development, and multilateral affairs. During the same month, the sixth round of Foreign Office Consultations between Bangladesh and South Africa was held in Pretoria after a six‑year hiatus, covering trade, investment, defence, education and sports.

== Economic cooperation ==
Bangladesh has promoted the Africa–Bangladesh Business Forum (ABBF), a private–led platform inaugurated in June 2024 in Conakry, Guinea, to facilitate business-to-business (B2B) matchmaking, investment promotion and market entry. The first Africa–Bangladesh Trade Show and Business Summit was held in Addis Ababa, Ethiopia, on 12–13 November 2025, drawing 40 Bangladeshi exhibitors and nearly 1,000 visitors. A second summit is scheduled for Lagos, Nigeria, in June 2026.

Bilateral trade between Bangladesh and Africa has grown steadily. In fiscal year 2024–25, Bangladesh exported goods worth $417.7 million to Africa, while African exports to Bangladesh totalled $2.90 billion. Key Bangladeshi exports include ready-made garments, pharmaceuticals, jute and jute goods, leather, ceramics and ICT services.

== See also ==
- Africa–Bangladesh Business Forum
- Foreign relations of Bangladesh
- Bangladesh–South Africa relations
- Bangladesh–Morocco relations
