= Africa–Bangladesh Business Forum =

- Abbreviation: ABBF
- Formation: 4 June 2024; 2 years ago
- Founded at: Conakry, Guinea
- Type: Business facilitation platform
- Legal status: Active
- Purpose: Strengthening trade, investment, and institutional partnerships between Africa and Bangladesh
- Services: Trade facilitation, B2B matchmaking, investment promotion, market entry support
- Website: africabangladesh.com

The Africa–Bangladesh Business Forum (ABBF) is a business-to-business (B2B) trade and investment platform dedicated to strengthening economic cooperation between Africa and Bangladesh. It was inaugurated on 4 June 2024 in Conakry, Guinea.

== Background ==
The forum was established to bridge businesses, investors, and institutions across Africa and Bangladesh through a trusted B2B engagement framework. It addresses common challenges faced by exporters and importers, including market entry barriers, lack of reliable partners, compliance complexities, logistics coordination, and access to accurate market intelligence.

The forum’s launch coincided with a broader Bangladeshi policy shift toward Africa, often referred to as the "Look Africa" initiative. In February 2025, the Bangladesh Institute of International and Strategic Studies (BIISS) published a volume titled Look Africa: Exploring New Horizons for Bangladesh, which explored the country’s growing engagement with the continent.

== Activities and events ==
=== Ethiopia summit (2025) ===
From 12 to 14 November 2025, ABBF co‑organised the Africa‑Bangladesh Trade Show & Business Summit in Addis Ababa, Ethiopia, together with the Embassy of Bangladesh in Ethiopia. The event was supported by the Export Promotion Bureau (EPB) and the Ministry of Foreign Affairs (Africa Wing). The summit brought together senior government officials, business leaders, and investors from multiple African countries and Bangladesh, covering sectors such as ICT, pharmaceuticals, plastics, jute, textiles, and chemicals. During the summit, the B2B platform Kingmansa.com was launched to facilitate digital trade between Africa and Bangladesh.

=== Post‑event get‑together in Dhaka (2026) ===
On 12 January 2026, ABBF organised a post‑event get‑together at the Bangladesh–China Friendship Exhibition Centre in Purbachal, Narayanganj, to review outcomes of the Ethiopia summit and identify concrete next steps for commercial partnerships. The event was attended by Mohammad Hassan Arif, Vice Chairman of the Export Promotion Bureau, as Chief Guest, and Brigadier General GM Shariful Islam, Defence Attaché at the Embassy of Bangladesh in Ethiopia, as Special Guest.

=== Nigeria summit (2026) ===
ABBF plans to hold a trade summit in Lagos, Nigeria, on 15–16 June 2026, designed to connect Bangladeshi exporters with Nigerian and wider African buyers, with a focus on B2B matchmaking and cross‑border business deals.

== Government support and diplomatic engagement ==
The forum operates with the backing of the Bangladeshi government. The Export Promotion Bureau (EPB) and the Ministry of Foreign Affairs (Africa Wing) have collaborated with ABBF in organising trade events.

State Minister for Foreign Affairs Shama Obaed Islam has repeatedly highlighted Bangladesh’s growing engagement with Africa. On the sidelines of the Dakar International Forum on Peace and Security in Africa (April 2026), she held bilateral meetings with the foreign ministers of Guinea, Gambia, Mali, Niger, Angola and others, focusing on trade, investment, agriculture, pharmaceuticals, ready‑made garments, jute and energy.

In May 2026, a separate bilateral B2B platform was launched between Bangladesh and Morocco in Rabat, with a Moroccan business delegation scheduled to visit Bangladesh in November 2026.

== Trade statistics ==
Bilateral trade between Bangladesh and Africa has grown steadily. In fiscal year 2022–23, Bangladesh exported goods worth $367 million to Africa; this rose to $386.5 million in 2023–24 and to $417.7 million in 2024–25. During the July–January period of 2025–26, exports reached $271 million. In the same periods, African exports to Bangladesh totalled $3.76 billion (2022–23), $2.84 billion (2023–24), $2.90 billion (2024–25) and $2.01 billion (July–January 2025–26).

== See also ==
- Bangladesh-Africa Relations
- Foreign relations of Bangladesh
- Economy of Bangladesh
- Export Promotion Bureau
