= Bank of China Group =

Former brand for Chinese state banks in Hong Kong

Bank of China Group (中銀集團; BOCG) was the brand used to denote 13 banks that were almost entirely owned by the Chinese government that operated in Hong Kong, until their merger in 2001 to form Bank of China (Hong Kong). The exception was the Hong Kong branch of the Bank of Communications, which left BOCG in 1998. The BOCG brand is still retained by the life insurance and casualty insurance operations of the Bank of China, in both Hong Kong and Mainland China.

== History ==
The opening of a branch of the Bank of China in Hong Kong in 1917 marked the entry of state-owned Chinese banks into the then colony's banking sector. Other banks soon followed suit, starting with Yien Yieh Commercial Bank in 1918.

By the time the People's Republic of China was established in 1949, there were 15 branches of state owned Chinese banks in Hong Kong, plus branches of nine Mainland-incorporated banks that were public-private joint ventures, namely:

- Sin Hua Bank Limited (SHB)
- China & South Sea Bank Limited (CSSB)
- Kincheng Banking Corporation (KBC)
- China State Bank Limited (CSBL)
- The National Commercial Bank Limited (TNCB)
- The Yien Yieh Commercial Bank Limited (YYCB)
- Young Brothers Banking Corporation
- Wo Sang Bank
- National Industrial Bank of China

In addition, the Chinese government established Po Sang Bank in 1949 and Nanyang Commercial Bank in 1950. Both of these were incorporated in Hong Kong.

=== Centralised management ===
In 1952, the nine public-private banks were grouped into the Joint Office of Joint Public-Private Banks. The Hong Kong branches of three of these (namely Young Brothers Banking Corporation, Wo Sang Bank and National Industrial Bank of China were closed in 1954 when their parents were scrapped, and management of the remaining six public-private banks were transferred to the Hong Kong and Macau Regional Office of the Bank of China in 1958. The Bank of China later took over management of the Hong Kong branches of Kwangtung Provincial Bank, Hua Chiao Commercial Bank and the Bank of Communications. All three were incorporated in the Mainland.

=== 1970-1980s ===
The Bank of China began accumulating stakes in Chiyu Banking Corporation in the 1970s. In June 1975, the Bank of China moved to increase the capital of the public-private banks. As all of the new capital were from the Chinese government, private ownership in the public-private banks were substantially reduced to less than 1%.

The 14 banks were rebranded as part of the Bank of China Group in the 1980s, after a common IT platform was established. Treasury and foreign currency exchange operations were also centralised.
