= University of International Business and Economics =

Public university in Beijing, China

Coordinates: 39.9792°N 116.4214°E

- 对外经济贸易大学
- Former name: Beijing Institute of Foreign Trade
- Motto: 博学，诚信，求索，笃行
- Motto in English: Erudition, Honesty, Endeavour, Perfection
- Type: Public
- Established: 1951; 75 years ago
- Affiliations: Under direct administration of Ministry of Education and Ministry of Commerce
- President: Zhao Zhongxiu
- Academic staff: 1,237 (2015)
- Administrative staff: 641 (2015)
- Students: 16,094 (2015)
- Undergraduates: 8,379 (2015)
- Postgraduates: 3,790 (2015)
- Doctoral students: 591 (2015)
- Other students: 3,334^{a} (2015)
- Location: Beijing, China
- Campus: Urban
- Nickname: Màodà (贸大)
- Mascots: "Cross Global and universe" (Symbol – also forms part of the logo)
- Website: www.uibe.edu.cn

Chinese name
- Simplified Chinese: 对外经济贸易大学
- Traditional Chinese: 對外經濟貿易大學
Transcriptions
Standard Mandarin
- Hanyu Pinyin: Duìwài Jīngjì Màoyì Dàxué

The University of International Business and Economics (UIBE; 对外经济贸易大学) is a public university located in Chaoyang, Beijing, China. It is affiliated with the Ministry of Education and co-funded by the Ministry of Education and the Ministry of Commerce. The university is part of Project 211 and the Double First-Class Construction. It is the only finance and economics university in China accredited by EQUIS, AACSB, CAMEA, and AMBA, and one of 15 universities in mainland China with AACSB, EQUIS, and AMBA accreditations(the fifth university in China to receive all three accreditations).

The university emphasizes on economics, finance, international business, management, business, law, foreign languages and international relations. and is recognized as one of China's leading universities in the studies of business and finance. It was established in 1951 in Beijing by the Ministry of Foreign Trade and Economic Cooperation of China.

== History ==
The university was formerly known as the Senior Business Cadre School and was founded in 1951. In 1953, it was renamed Beijing Foreign Trade College. In 1954, the foreign trade major of the Department of Trade of Renmin University of China was merged into the Beijing College of Foreign Trade, and the Beijing College of Foreign Trade was established. In 1984, it was renamed the University of International Business and Economics. In June 2000, the former China Finance Institute and the former University of International Business and Economics merged to form a new University of International Business and Economics, which was placed under the management of the Ministry of Education. In December 2010, the Ministry of Education and the Ministry of Commerce signed an agreement to jointly build the University of International Business and Economics.

The Israel campus was closed in 2024 as China–Israel relations worsened amid the Gaza conflict.

== Schools and Departments ==
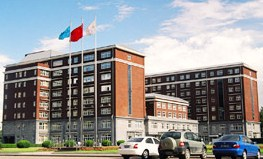

The university is organized into a number of schools and research institutes covering fields such as international trade, finance, business administration, law, languages, public administration, and information technology.

The School of International Trade and Economics is one of the university's main academic units and focuses on teaching and research in international trade, international finance, and related disciplines. The school includes seven departments and ten research centers. The China School of Banking and Finance was established in 2001 through the merger of the university's School of Banking and Finance with the former China Institution of Finance, which had been affiliated with the People's Bank of China. The school offers undergraduate, master's, and doctoral programs in finance and related fields and enrolls about 1,500 students, including undergraduate, graduate, and doctoral students, as well as international and part-time graduate students.

The School of Business was established in 1982 as the Department of International Business Management and is one of the larger schools at the university. Its programs cover areas including accounting, finance, marketing, management, and human resource management, and some courses are taught in English using teaching materials from the United States. As of May 2014, the school was a member of the Association to Advance Collegiate Schools of Business (AACSB) and the European Quality Improvement System (EQUIS). The School of Law, founded in 1984, focuses on legal education and research, particularly in international law, and includes a state-approved key discipline in that field.

The School of Foreign Studies, tracing its origins to the Beijing Foreign Trade College (1954), comprises twelve language departments: Arabic, French, German, Italian, Japanese, Korean, Persian, Portuguese, Russian, Spanish, Vietnamese, and Modern Greek, and hosts the Sino-Italian Language Training Centre. The School of International Education supports the university's international students enrolled in degree and non-degree programmes, including Chinese language and Business Chinese courses. Other units include the School of Information Technology and Management Engineering, the Research Institute for Global Value Chains, the School of Public Administration, the School of Insurance and Economics, the School of Chinese Language and Literature, the Sino-French International Management School, Zhuoyue International School, the China Institute for WTO Studies, the Institute of International Economics, the School of Distance Education, and the School of Executive Development.

== Rankings and Reputation ==
In the Shanghai Ranking, UIBE ranks third among finance and economics universities in China, with its Applied Economics program also placed third nationwide, behind only Peking University and Renmin University of China.

UIBE ranks 41th globally in the U.S. News "Best Global Universities for Economics and Business." It is ranked 78th in the QS International Trade Rankings 2026 for MBA and Master's programs, and 169th in the QS World University Rankings by Subject 2025 for Economics & Econometrics.

== Campus ==
The campus has been nicknamed "Hui Garden" (惠园). Seven buildings are either dormitories or classroom buildings. There is a major academic building at the northwest of the site, which used to belong to the China Institute of Finance, named Boxue (博学楼). Another modern teaching building is located in the southeastern corner, named Ningyuan (宁远楼). There is also an imposing structure in the middle of the campus, named Chengxin (诚信楼). A new library building was opened in October 2008.

Apart from the sports areas, there is a Chinese garden (south side), a bird cage, and a pond dubbed the "Back Sea" (see Houhai) by students.

== Notable alumni ==
Business and Economics Sector:

- Gao Xiqing (高西庆) – cofounder of China securities market, CEO of China Investment Corporation, former vice President of National Social Security Fund (NSSF), former Vice President of China Securities Regulatory Commission(CSRC)
- Lin Jianhai (林建海) – first-ever Secretary of International Monetary Fund (IMF) from China
- Zhou Mingchen (周明臣) – former Chairman of Board, COFCO Group (China Oil and Foodstuffs Corporation)
- Gu Yongjiang (谷永江) – former Chairman of Board, China Resource and Vice Minister of China Foreign Trade and Economic Cooperation
- Weijian Shan (单伟建) – CEO of PAG Group, former professor at Wharton Business School of the University of Pennsylvania, former Managing Director of JPMorgan Chase, former Partner at TPG Capital
- Geng Xin (耿欣) – CEO of Daiwa Securities (China)(大和証券-中国)
- Yu Xubo (于旭波) – Chairman of Board, China General Technology (Group)
- Bessie Yuan (原欣) – President and Managing Director of SAP Greater China
- Liu Jinbao (刘金宝) –Former CEO of Bank of China (Hong Kong)
- Wang Jinlong (王金龙) – President of Starbucks AP, Senior Vice President of Starbucks International
- Hong Hao (洪灏) – Managing Partner of Lotus Asset Management, and former Head of Research for Bank of Communications (BOCOM) International

Politics and Law Sector:

- Gao Xiaoli (高晓力) – incumbent Vice President and Grand Justice of China Supreme People's Court (SPC), and fifteenth President of the United Nations Appeals Tribunal
- Liu Guixiang (刘贵祥) – incumbent Grand Justice (vice-minister level) of the China Supreme People's Court (SPC)
- Gong Ming (宫鸣) – former Deputy Procurator-General of the Supreme People's Procuratorate
- Shi Guangsheng (石广生) – former Minister of China Foreign Trade and Economic Cooperation
- Wang Shouwen (王受文) – former China International Trade Representative (Full Ministerial Rank) and Vice Minister of Commerce of China
- Li Yongjie (李詠箑) – Permanent Representative of China to the World Trade Organization (WTO)
- Cao Weizhou (曹卫洲) – Deputy Secretary-General of the Standing Committee, National People's Congress of China
- Yang Fuchang (杨福昌) – former Vice Minister, Ministry of Foreign Affairs, People's Republic of China, and former President of China Foreign Affairs University
- Zhou Wenzhong (周文重) – former Ambassador of the People's Republic of China to the United States of America from 2005 to 2010
- Gong Zheng (龚正) – Mayor of Shanghai and former Governor of Shandong
- Wang Guiying (王桂英) – Deputy Governor of Shandong
- Song Hai (宋海) – former Deputy Governor of Guangdong
- Zhang Jiping (张继平) – Chair and Partner of Haiwen & Partners ("Red Circle" Elite Law Firm in China)

Society, Arts and Cultural Sector:

- Li Jinyan (李金艳) – Interim Dean (2009-2010), Full Professor, Osgoode Hall Law School, York University, Canada
- Yong Mei (咏梅) – Chinese actress, winner of Silver Bear for Best Actress at the 69th Berlin International Film Festival
- Li Xiang (李湘) – Chinese actress, host and singer
