= Out of the Gobi =

2019 autobiography by Weijian Shan

Out of the Gobi: My Story of China and America
- Author: Weijian Shan
- Genre: Autobiography
- Publisher: Wiley
- Publication date: 2019; 7 years ago

Out of the Gobi: My Story of China and America is a 2019 non-fiction autobiographical book by Weijian Shan.

It was published in January of that year. John Pomfret of The Washington Post wrote that due to internal factors, there had "not been a single credible memoir by a Chinese insider who played at the nexus of the nation's business and political elites."

Janet Yellen wrote the introduction of the book; she was a professor at the University of California, Berkeley, who advised Shan on his work.

== Background ==
Shan started writing the book when he was a professor at Wharton in 1990. He revisited the book in 2017 and published it in 2019, which serendipitously coincided with the 40th anniversary of the US and China normalizing ties.

== Content ==
The memoir first details the author's experience, beginning at age 15 in 1969, in the Construction Army Corps in the Gobi Desert during the Cultural Revolution. In the book he stated that his English learning was done through radio broadcasts that were not allowed under the rules. He did his work for six years before attending a university in Beijing. He later joined the teaching staff of the Beijing Institute of Foreign Trade. Beginning in 1980 he studied at University of San Francisco, making him one of the first post-Cultural Revolution US-based Chinese students.

== Release ==
Shan conducted promotional activity for this book in his city of residence, Hong Kong, as well as New York City in the United States and London in the United Kingdom.

== Reception ==
Pomfret wrote that people who have not yet studied China may gain a lot of understanding by reading the book though people relatively familiar with the subject matter would perceive it as "a little old" (meaning too familiar).

Isabella Steger of Quartz wrote that the author "demonstrates a kind of frankness that is increasingly hard to find among Chinese people in" 2019.

The USC US-China Institute of the University of Southern California wrote that the work is "powerful and personal perspective on China and America".
