= BOC Group =

BOC Group may refer to:

- Bank of China Group (BOCG), simplified Chinese: 中银集团; traditional Chinese: 中銀集團
- Boc group, a protecting group used in organic chemistry
- BOC (company), a British-based chemical company
