= Continental Bank =

Former Chinese bank

Continental Bank (Chinese: 大陸銀行) was a bank in China. It specialized in savings, warehouses, trusts and real estate business. It was founded in Tianjin in 1919 by Feng Guozhang, the acting president of Republic of China and Tan Lisun, the former Nanjing director of Bank of China. Half a month later, a Beijing branch was also established. In 1942, its headquarters was moved to Shanghai. In 1952, it was closed down.

Tha bank, together with Yien Yieh Commercial Bank, Kincheng Banking Corporation and China & South Sea Bank, are called "Four Northern Banks", which were the four most capitalized commercial banks in Northern China in the 1920s.

The Continental Bank's building on West Jiaomin Lane in Beijing, erected in 1924, became the seat of a short-lived Agricultural Bank of China in 1955-1957 and was subsequently taken over by the People's Bank of China. In 1979, the newly re-established Bank of China was headquartered in the former Continental Bank building, before moving in 2001 to a new building on Fuxingmen Inner Street designed by I. M. Pei. In 2021, the former Continental Bank building was converted into a museum.

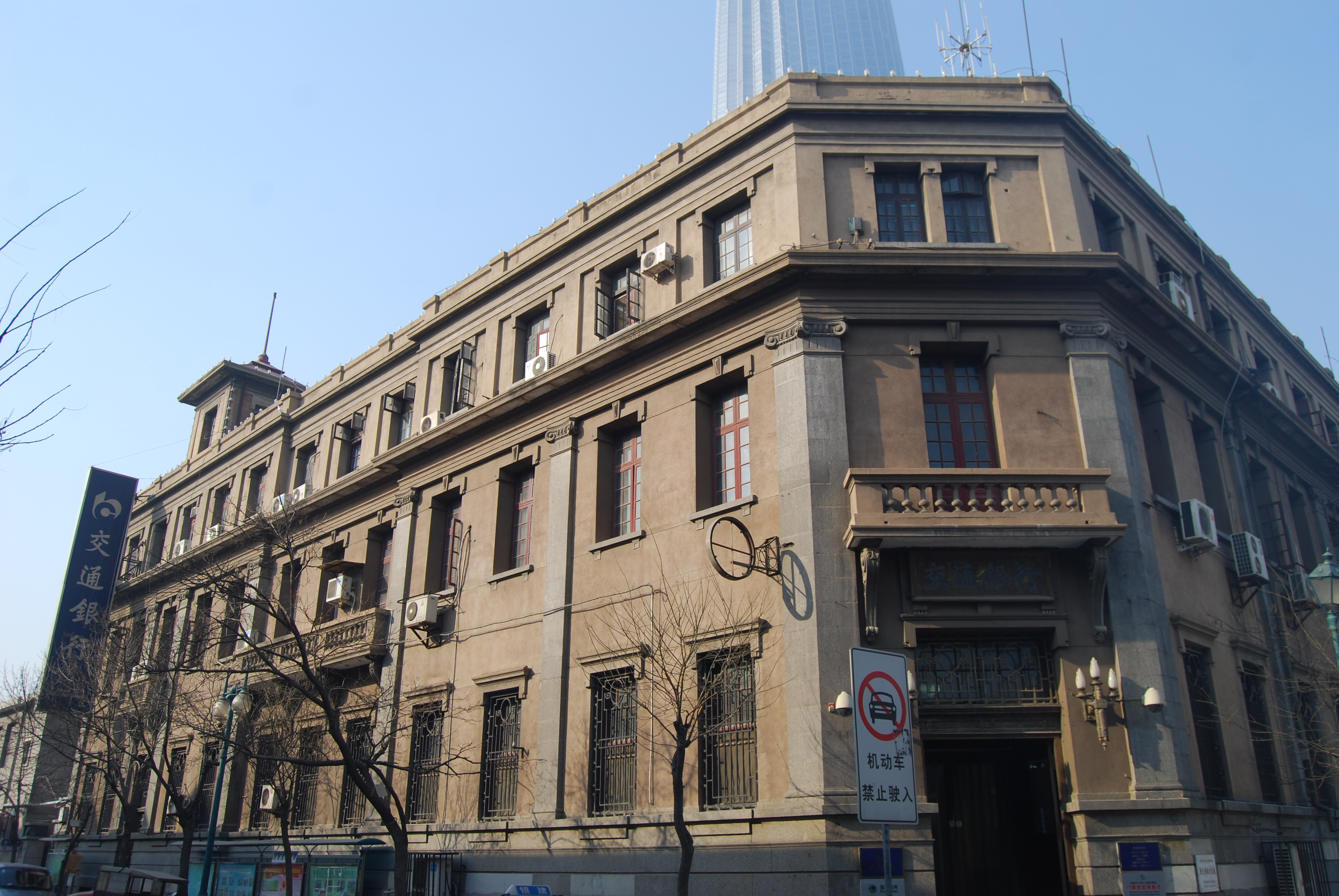
Former Continental Bank head office building in Tianjin

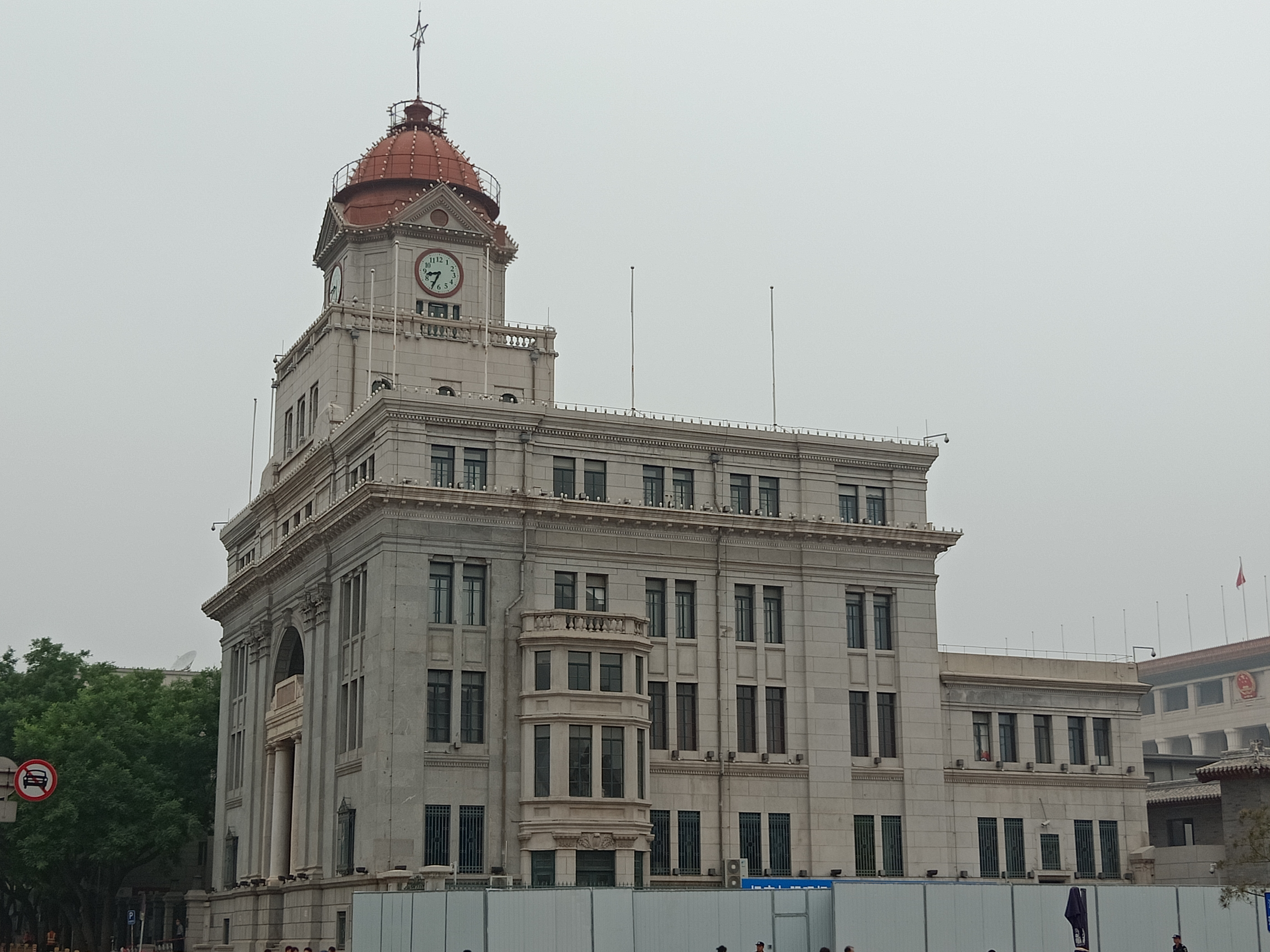
Former Continental Bank Beijing building

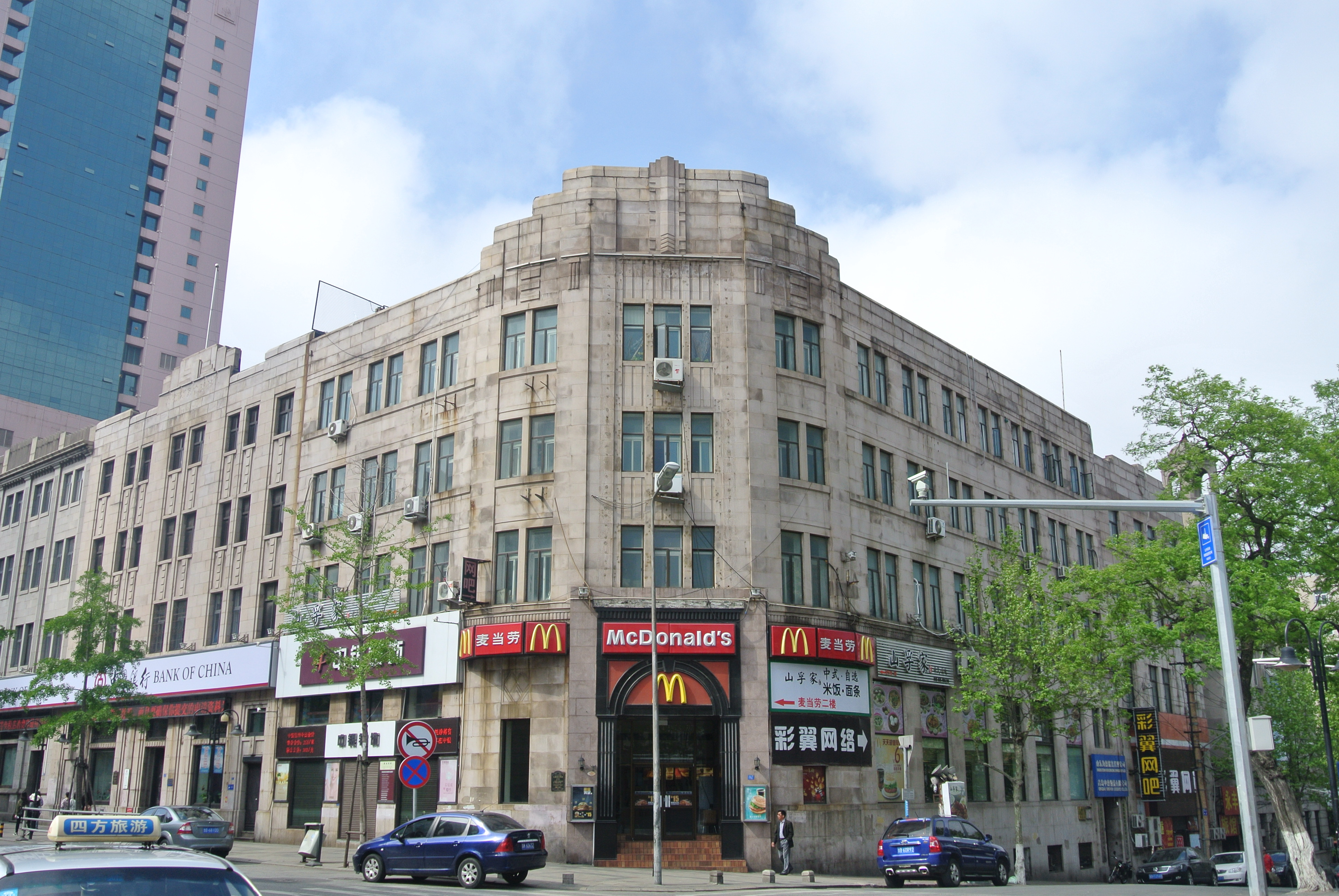
Former branch building in Qingdao

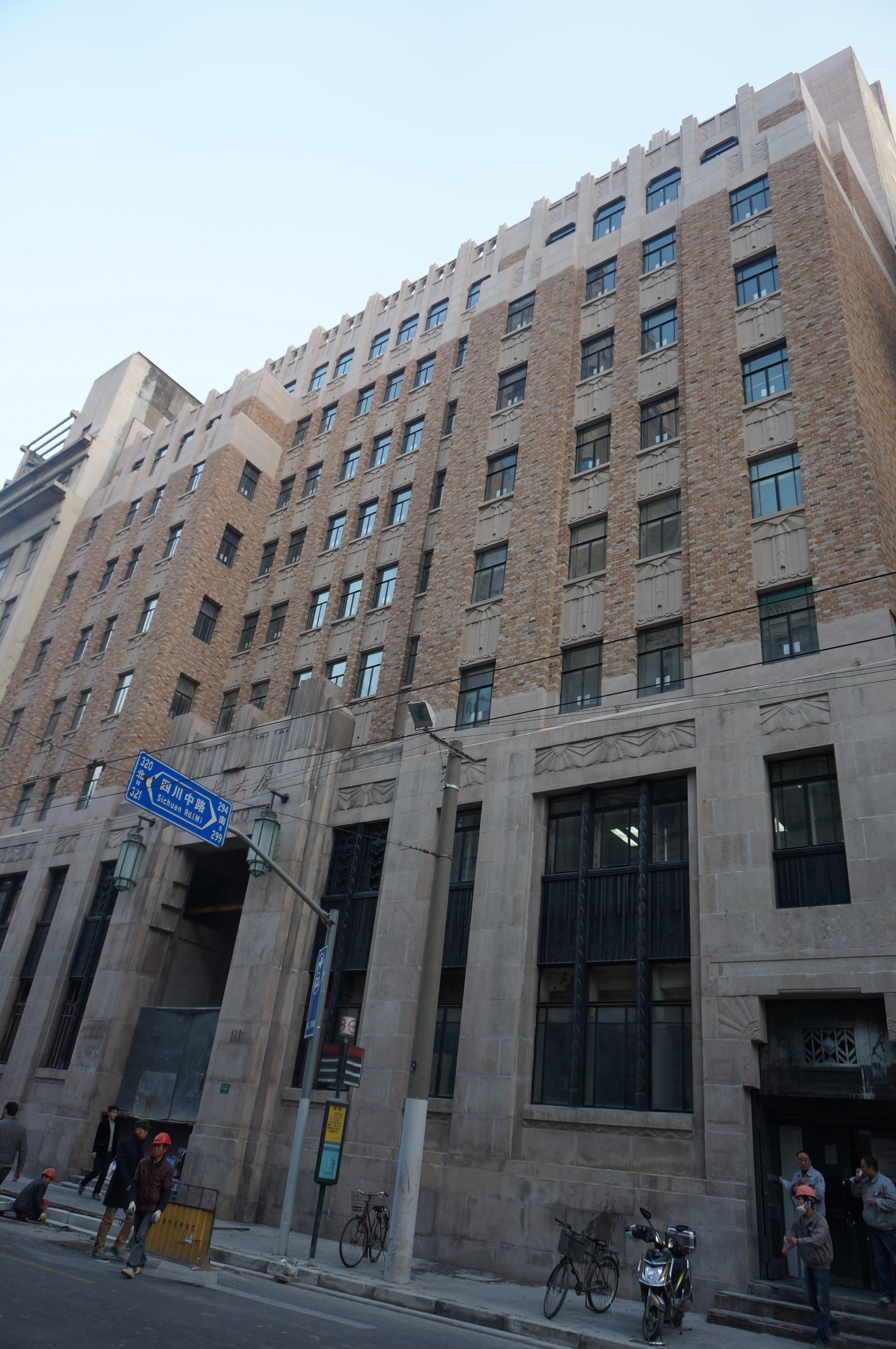
Former Continental Bank building in Shanghai

== See also ==
- Four Northern Banks
