= Bank of China Building (Hong Kong) =

Office building in Hong Kong

Coordinates: 22.2802585°N 114.1600567°E

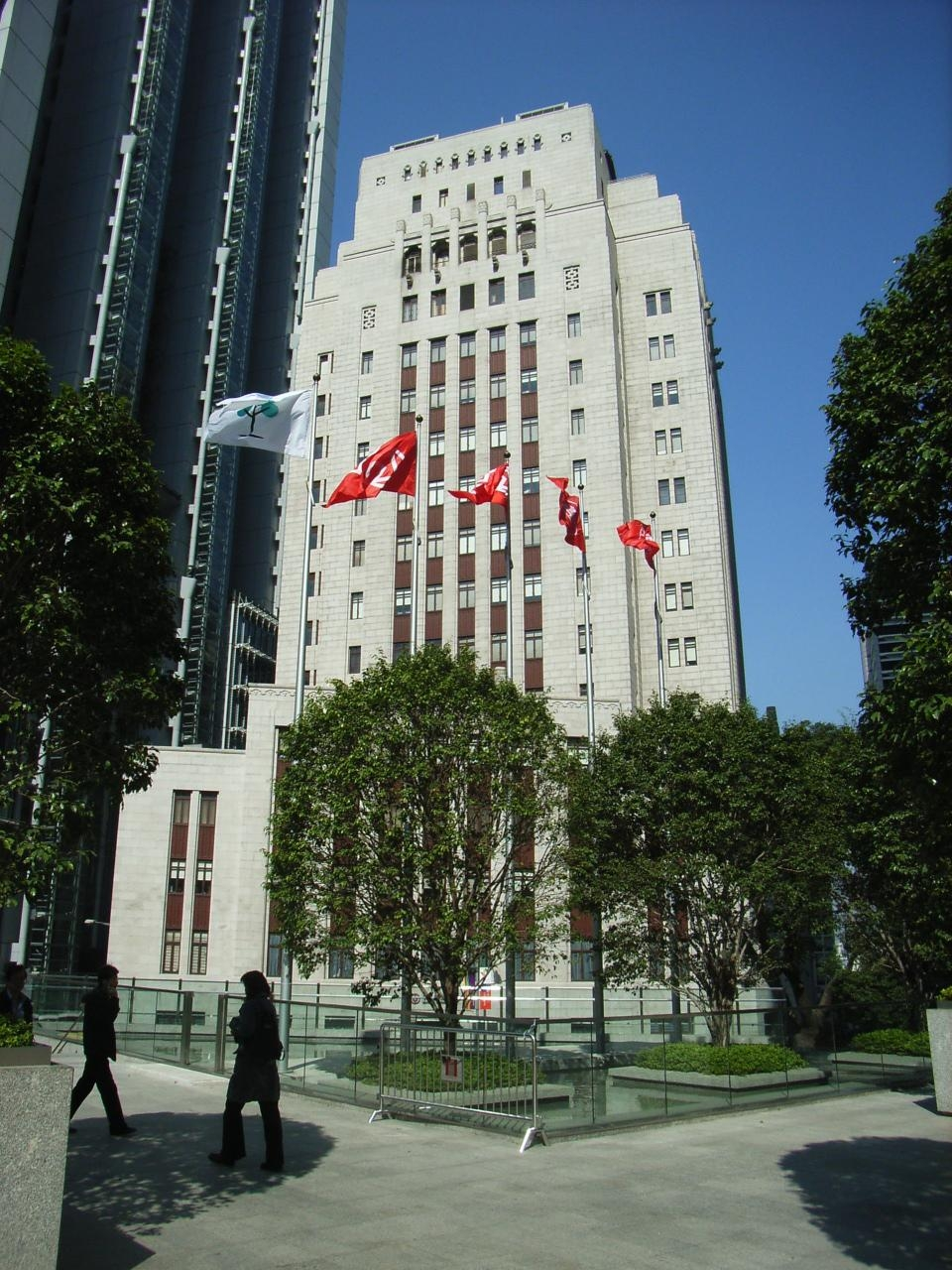
Bank of China Building viewed from Cheung Kong Center.

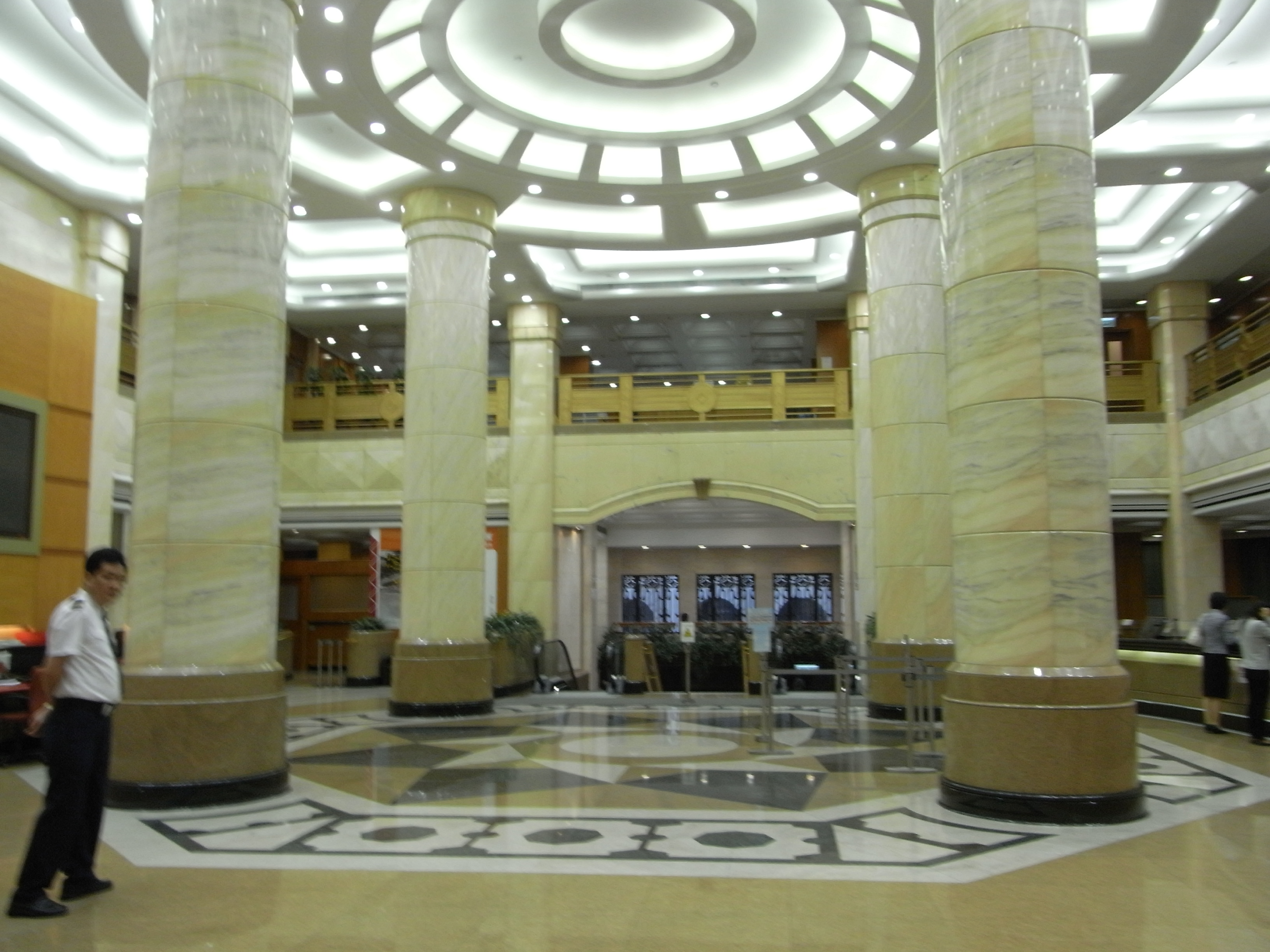
Bank hall interior in 1950s architectural style

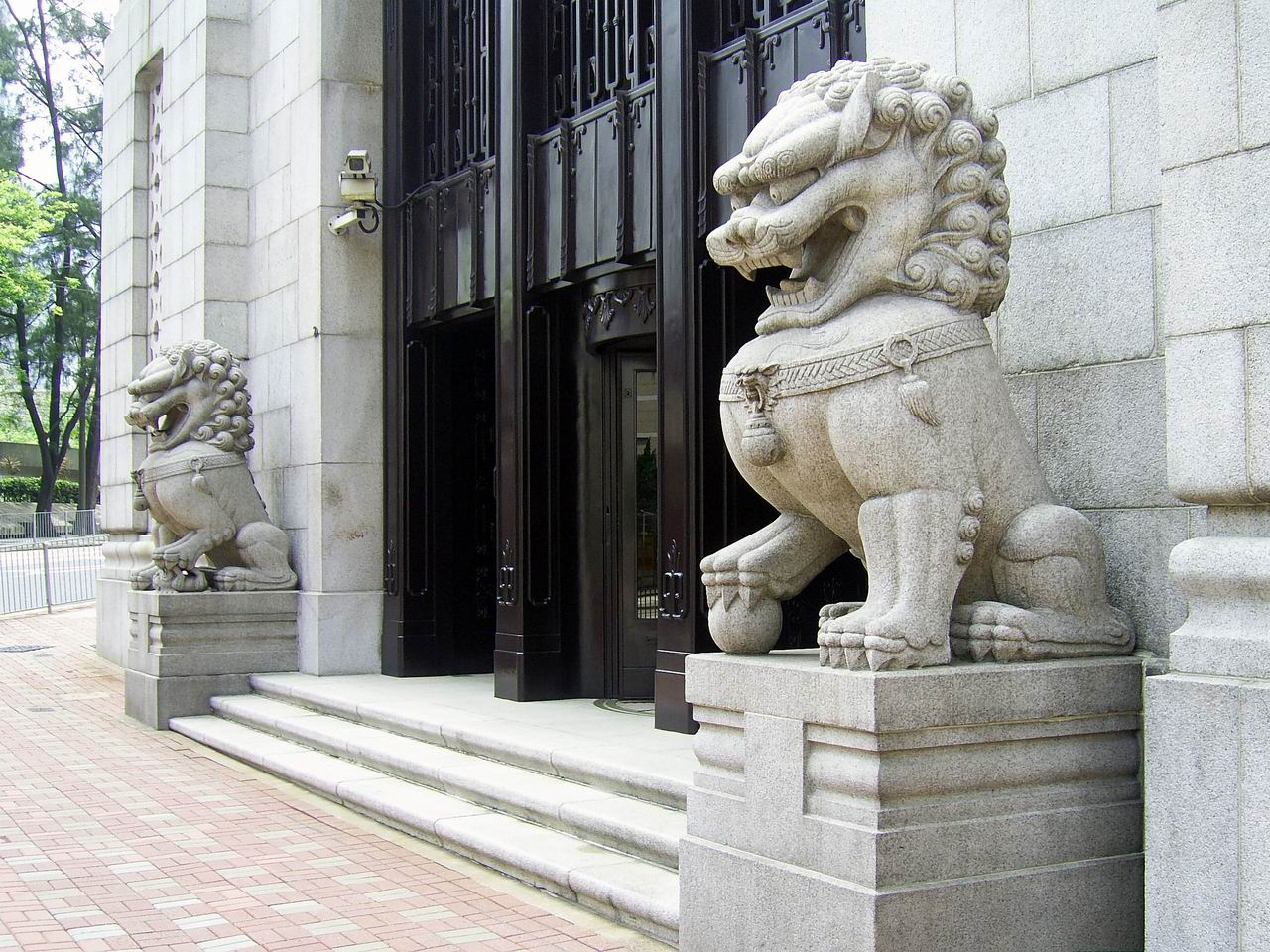
Des Voeux Road Central entrance.

Bank of China Building (Chinese: 中國銀行大廈) is located at no.2A Des Voeux Road Central, Central, Hong Kong. It is a sub-branch of Bank of China (Hong Kong).

== History ==
The site was originally occupied by the eastern part of the old City Hall, which had been built in 1869. The western part of the City Hall was demolished in 1933 to make way for the 3rd generation of the Hong Kong & Shanghai Bank Building, while the eastern part was demolished in 1947 to make way for the Bank of China Building.

It was designed by Palmer & Turner and built by Wimpey Construction in 1951 with a goal to surpass the 3rd generation Hong Kong & Shanghai Bank Building nearby to become the tallest building in Hong Kong at the time.

The Bank of China Building was originally the headquarters of Bank of China in Hong Kong. In 1991, when the headquarters moved into the new Bank of China Tower, this building was used by Sin Hua Bank as its headquarters. After the restructuring of China's banks to form Bank of China (Hong Kong) in 2001, the building was returned to the Bank of China again and is used as a sub-branch.

== Features ==
The China Club, a retro-chic, Shanghai-style club and restaurant, opened on 8 September 1991 on the top three floors (13th/14th/15th) of the building.

== See also ==
- Timeline of tallest buildings in Hong Kong

== Sources ==
- White, Valerie (1980). Wimpey: The first hundred years. George Wimpey.
