= Four Northern Banks =

Historic group of banks in China

Four Northern Banks (Chinese: 北四行) referred to the four most capitalized commercial banks in the north of the Yangtze River in the Republic of China in the 1920s, in contrast to the Three Southern Banks (南三行) of Southern China.

The four banks were the Yien Yieh Commercial Bank (鹽業銀行), the Kincheng Banking Corporation (金城銀行), the Continental Bank (大陸銀行) and the China & South Sea Bank (中南銀行).

== See also ==
- Yien Yieh Commercial Bank
- Kincheng Banking Corporation
- Continental Bank
- China & South Sea Bank
- Three Southern Banks
