= Weijian Shan =

Chinese economist

- 單偉建
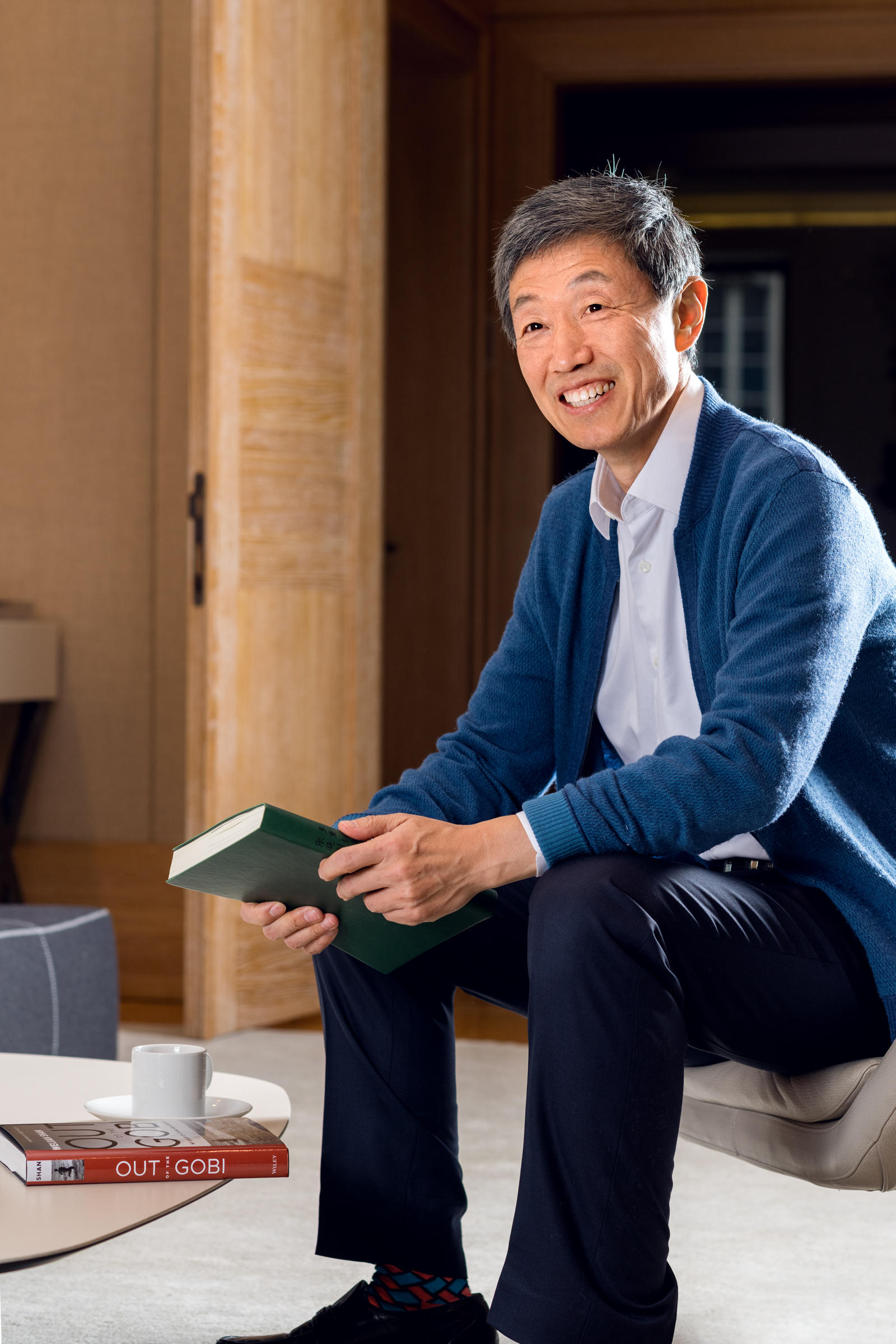
- Born: 1954 (age 71–72); Beijing, China
- Education: University of International Business and Economics (Beijing); University of San Francisco; University of California, Berkeley
- Title: Executive Chairman, PAG

Weijian Shan (Chinese: 單偉建; pinyin: Shàn Wěijiàn; born 1954) is a Chinese economist, businessman, and author based in Hong Kong. He is the executive chairman of PAG, a leading alternative investment firm focused on the Asia Pacific region. He currently serves as a trustee of the British Museum and as an independent director of Alibaba Group.

Shan authored Out of the Gobi, a memoir recounting his experience during the Cultural Revolution.

== Biography ==
Born in 1954 and raised in Beijing, Shan grew up in the midst of the Cultural Revolution. In 1969, when Mao Zedong closed all universities and dispatched youngsters to the countryside, Shan was sent to Inner Mongolia where he would spend 6 years in the Gobi Desert. He returned to Beijing in 1975 and enrolled at the Beijing Institute of Foreign Trade (now University of International Business and Economics) where he would study English.

Shan later moved to the United States as part of the first cohort of mainland Chinese students studying abroad after the Cultural Revolution. He earned an MBA from the University of San Francisco before continuing his studies at the University of California, Berkeley where he would earn a M.A. and PhD.

In 1987, Shan joined the World Bank in Washington, D.C. as an investment officer. He served as an assistant professor at the Wharton School of the University of Pennsylvania for 6 years, where he founded the China Economic Review.

Shan held various positions at J.P. Morgan between 1993 and 1998, eventually rising to become a Managing Director. Shortly thereafter, he became a co-managing partner at Newbridge Capital, later renamed TPG Asia, and a partner of TPG.

Shan is a member of the board of trustees of the British Museum and an independent director of the Alibaba Group. Shan is a frequent contributor to journals and newspapers. His commentaries have been featured in the New York Times, the Financial Times, the Wall Street Journal, Foreign Affairs and others. His memoir, Out of the Gobi, was published by Wiley in January 2019.

== Books ==
- Out of the Gobi: My Story of China and America (2019)
- Money Games: The Inside Story of How American Dealmakers Saved Korea's Most Iconic Bank (2020)
- Money Machine: A Trailblazing American Venture in China (2023)
