= China Economic Review (journal) =

- Discipline: Economics
- Language: English
- Edited by: Belton M. Fleisher

Publication details
- History: 1989–present
- Publisher: Elsevier on behalf of the Chinese Economists Society
- Frequency: Quarterly (biannually until 2000)
- Impact factor: 2.736 (2019)

Standard abbreviations
- ISO 4: China Econ. Rev.

Indexing
- ISSN: 1043-951X
- LCCN: 90656610
- OCLC no.: 19614844

Links
- Journal homepage; Online access

The China Economic Review is a leading peer-reviewed academic journal of Chinese economics, covering quantitative, analytical, and performance and policy analysis on China's economy, its relations with the rest of the world, and other comparative studies. It is an official publication of the Chinese Economists Society. The founding editor-in-chief was Weijian Shan, and the current editor is Belton M. Fleisher.
