= China State Bank =

Chinese bank

China State Bank (Chinese: 國華商業銀行) was a bank in China.

== History ==
- 1928: Established in Shanghai with its Chinese name of 國華銀行.
- 1938: Set up Hong Kong branches.
- 1948: Changed its Chinese name to 國華商業銀行.
- 1980: Moved its headquarters to Beijing.
- 1989: Became a wholly owned subsidiary of Bank of China Group.
- 2001: Merged to form Bank of China (Hong Kong).
