= Yangtze River Pharmaceutical Group =

Chinese multinational pharmaceutical corporation headquartered in Taizhou, China

Yangtze River Pharmaceutical Group, Ltd.
- Type: Private ownership
- Industry: Pharmaceutical
- Founded: 1971
- Headquarters: Taizhou, China
- Area served: Central/Southeast Asia
- Key people: Xu Jingren, Founder/President Xu Haoyu, Chairman/Interim CEO
- Products: Antibiotics, Chemotherapy drugs, herbal remedies
- Revenue: ▲US$ 19.533 billion(2014)
- Total assets: ▲US$ 90.801 billion(2014)
- Number of employees: 13,000 (2016)
- Website: yangzijiang.com#/english/home/home

Yangtze River Pharmaceutical Group (Chinese: 扬子江药业集团, YRPG) is a Chinese multinational pharmaceutical corporation headquartered in Taizhou, Jiangsu Province in the People's Republic of China, and with its research headquarters in Shanghai. It is one of the Asia's largest pharmaceutical companies by revenues, and was listed in 2014 as being China's second largest pharmaceutical manufacturer, and leading company for technological and entrepreneurial innovation.

== History ==
Founded in 1971, the Yangtze River Pharmaceutical Group started as a local firm providing drugstores and hospitals with vitamin supplements and pain medication. In a prime location between the major cities of Shanghai, Suzhou, and Hangzhou, the YRPG quickly expanded its business profile. The group has experienced significant growth in the past decade, having quadrupled their net income between 2003 and 2010. In the fiscal year 2014, board shareholders received a record 560% return on investment, and company assets rapidly expanded.

== Family ==
With the company's quickly rising profile, founder Xu Jingren and his extended family—who jointly own a controlling stake in the corporation—have made a number of significant business acquisitions. Collectively, they are believed to be worth up to US$7.5 billion. In addition to his role as president and primary shareholder of YRPG, Xu Jingren is a member of the National People's Congress and serves as an honorary minister in the Ministry of Health. He has been recognized as a leading proponent of industrial modernization, worker's rights, and governmental reform within the Chinese Communist Party.
