= China Club =

Restaurant in Hong Kong

The China Club
- Formation: 1991 (35 years ago)
- Founders: Sir David Tang
- Type: Gentlemen's club
- Location: Bank of China Building (Hong Kong)
- Official language: English and Chinese
- Affiliations: Arts and Culture; Shanghai-style

China Club
- Traditional Chinese: 中國會
- Simplified Chinese: 中国会
Transcriptions
Standard Mandarin
- Hanyu Pinyin: Zhōngguóhuì
Yue: Cantonese
- Yale Romanization: Jūng gwok wuih
- Jyutping: Zung1 gwok3 wui6*2

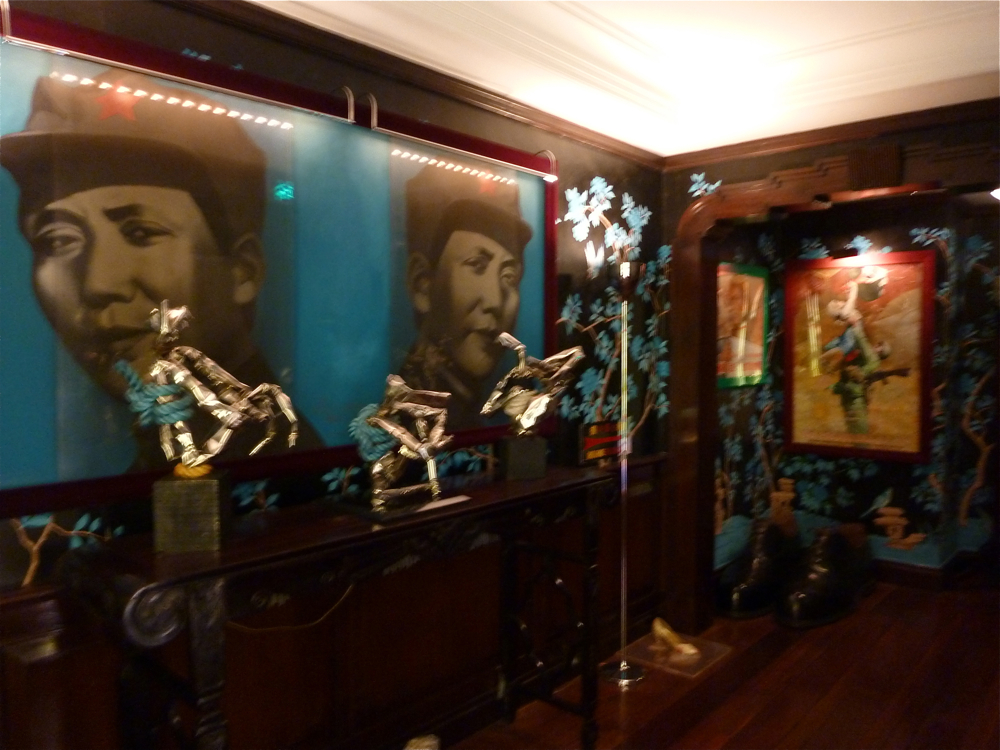
Retro chic modern Chinese art at the 14th floor, China Club

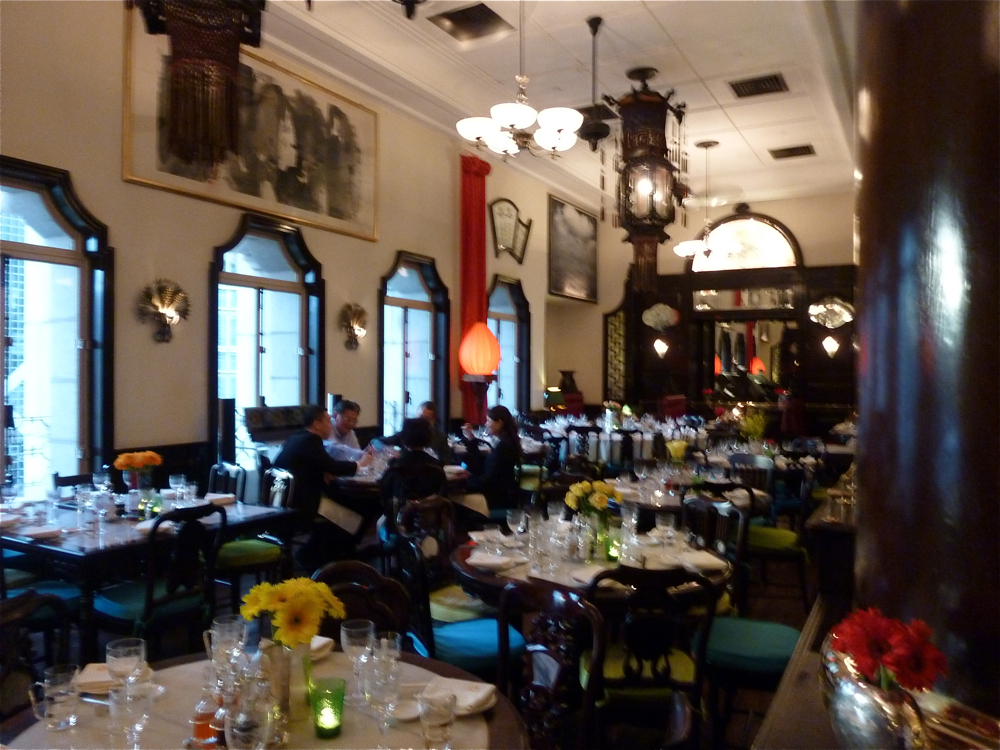
Main dining room, 13th floor, China Club

The China Club is a retro-chic, Shanghai-style, private members' club in Central, Hong Kong. It relates to the former China Clubs in Singapore and Beijing.

The China Club opened on 8 September 1991 on the top three floors (13th/14th/15th) of the Bank of China Building in Central, Hong Kong. The restaurant serves traditional Hong Kong Chinese food. The traditional Chinese breakfast of congee, crullers (yau tiu), and dim sum similar to those found in street stalls is served. Home-style and haute cuisine as well as western influenced Asian food like that of Tai Ping Koon are offered at lunches and dinners.

The decor is in the style of the traditional Chinese tea-house. The floors, lighting and fans are reminiscent of 1930s Shanghai.

The 13th floor is the main dining room. The 14th floor houses private rooms and the Long March Bar. The 15th floor houses private rooms in which cards and mah-jong can be played. It also houses a library of several thousand books on China and Chinese culture.

== See also ==
- David Tang
