= Lin Jianhai =

Chinese economist

- 林建海
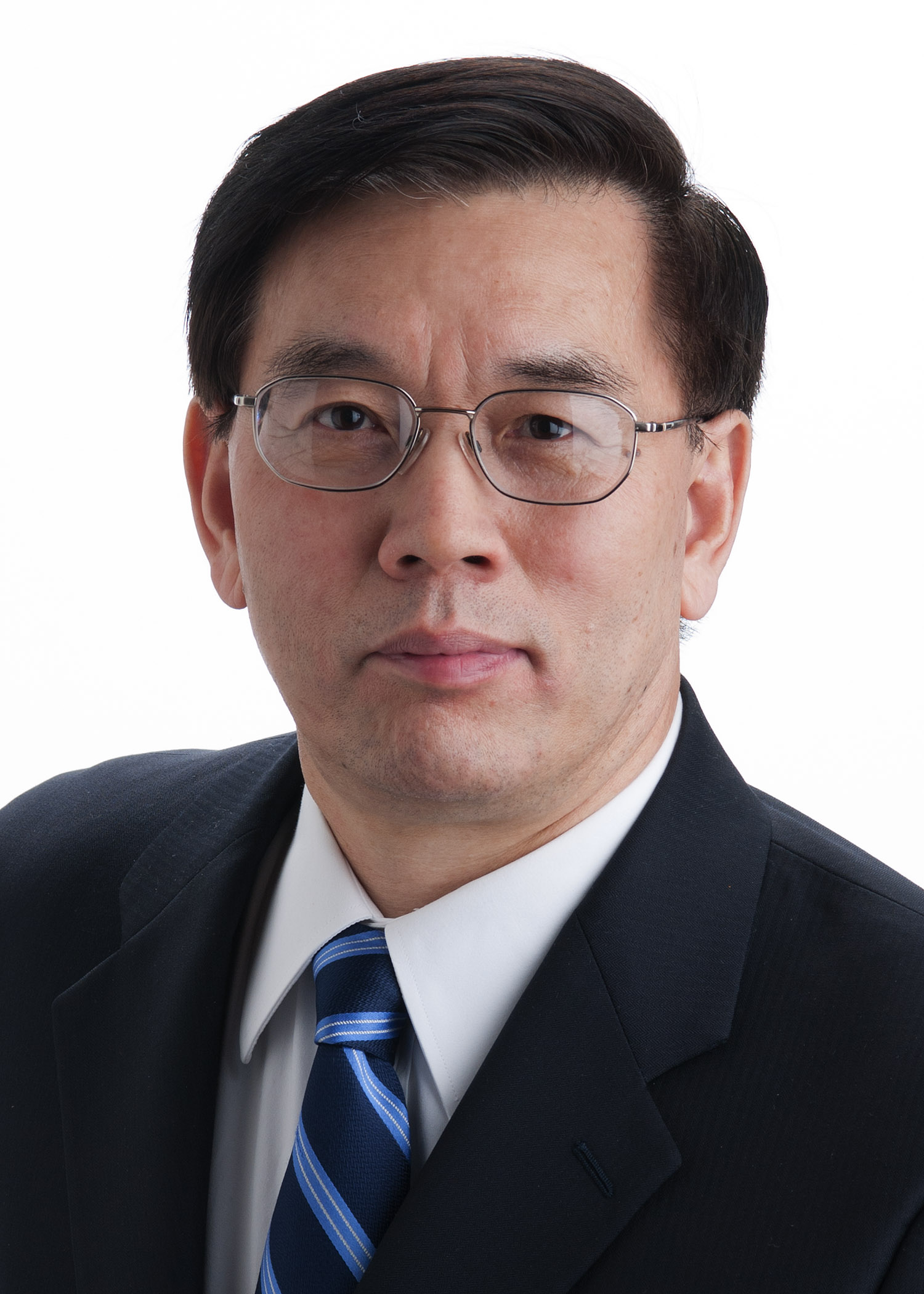
- Born: April 1, 1955 (age 71); Yueqing, Zhejiang, China
- Education: University of International Business and Economics; University of California, Berkeley; George Washington University
- Occupation: Economist
- Years active: 1989-2020
- Title: Secretary of the International Monetary Fund
- Children: 3

Lin Jianhai (Chinese: 林建海; pinyin: Līn Jìanhǎi) is a Chinese economist and first-ever Secretary of the International Monetary Fund from China. He was appointed to this position in March 2012. During his IMF career (beginning in 1989), Lin worked across a wide range of country, policy, and administrative issues, including serving senior positions in the Secretary's, Finance, Policy Development and Review, and Asian and Pacific Departments. He currently manages the Secretary's Department which is the operations arm of the Executive Board.

As the Secretary of the International Monetary Fund, Lin oversees the Secretary's Department that has operational responsibility for the 24-member Executive Board, and serves as the official contact point of the International Monetary Fund's 189 member countries on institutional matters, including work of the Board of Governors and the policy-guiding International Monetary and Financial Committee. The Secretary's Department also organizes the Spring and Annual Meetings, and is the creator and custodian of the International Monetary Fund's official record.

In February 2020, it was announced the Lin would be retiring from the International Monetary Fund. Current IMF Managing Director (as of August 2020) Kristalina Georgieva stated that "Jianhai has played a critical role at the IMF... [and] will leave a legacy of outstanding service to our membership... [he] is a key driving force behind the Meetings having become the place every policy maker wants to be to discuss the critical economic and financial issues of the day". Lin officially stepped back from his responsibilities at the end of April in preparation for his retirement at the end of August.

== Early life and education ==
Lin was born in Panshi Town (磐石镇), Yueqing (乐清市), Zhejiang, China. Lin studied at the University of International Business and Economics in Beijing, China, and at the University of California, Berkeley. He earned his doctorate in international finance from George Washington University. Before joining the International Monetary Fund, he worked in the financial sector and academia.
