= Bank of China Tower (Hong Kong) =

Supertall skyscraper in Central, Hong Kong

- 中銀大廈
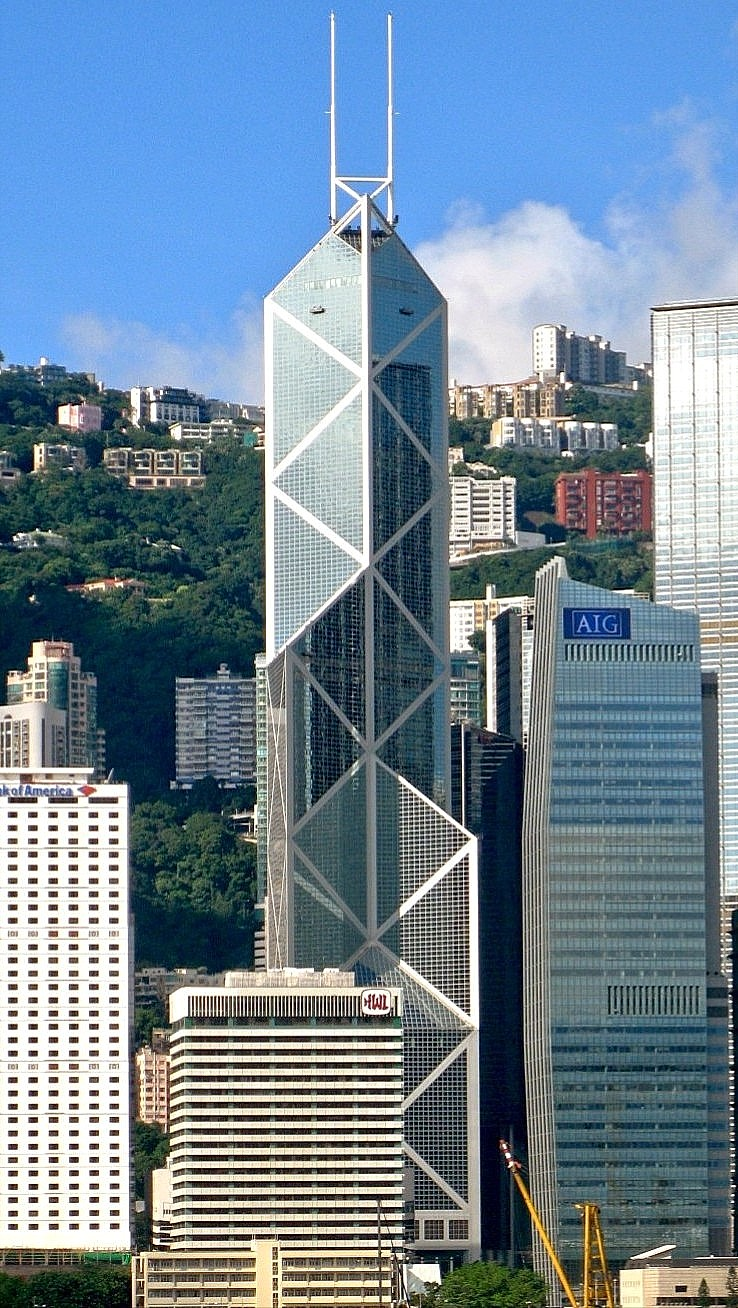
- Bank of China Tower
- Interactive map of the Bank of China Tower area

General information
- Status: Completed
- Type: Commercial offices
- Location: 1 Garden Road; Central, Hong Kong
- Coordinates: 22°16′45″N 114°09′41″E
- Construction started: 18 April 1985; 41 years ago
- Completed: 1990; 36 years ago
- Opening: 17 May 1990; 36 years ago

Height
- Architectural: 367.4 m (1,205.4 ft)
- Antenna spire: 52.4 m (172 ft)
- Roof: 315 m (1,033.5 ft)
- Top floor: 288.3 m (945.9 ft)

Technical details
- Floor count: 72 (+4 basement floors)
- Floor area: 130,000 m^{2} (1,400,000 sq ft)
- Lifts/elevators: 49

Design and construction
- Architects: I. M. Pei & Partners; Sherman Kung & Associates Architects Ltd. Thomas Boada S.L.
- Engineer: Jaros, Baum & Bolles (MEP Design)
- Structural engineer: Leslie E. Robertson Associates RLLP
- Main contractor: HKC (Holdings) Ltd; Kumagai HK

Chinese name
- Traditional Chinese: 中銀大廈
- Simplified Chinese: 中银大厦
- Cantonese Yale: Jūngngán Daaihhah
Transcriptions
Standard Mandarin
- Hanyu Pinyin: Zhōngyín Dàshà
Yue: Cantonese
- Yale Romanization: Jūngngán Daaihhah
- Jyutping: Zung1ngan2 Daai6haa6
- IPA: [tsʊŋ˥.ŋɐn˧˥ taj˨.ha˨]

The Bank of China Tower (BOC Tower) is a skyscraper located in Central, Hong Kong. Located at 1 Garden Road on Hong Kong Island, the tower houses the headquarters of the Bank of China (Hong Kong) Limited. One of the most recognisable landmarks in Hong Kong, the building is notable for its distinct shape and design, consisting of triangular frameworks covered by glass curtain walls.

The building was designed by Chinese-American architect I. M. Pei and L. C. Pei of I. M. Pei and Partners. At a height of 315 m (1,033.5 ft), reaching 367.4 m (1,205.4 ft) high including a 52.4 m (172 ft) spire, the building is the fourth tallest skyscraper in Hong Kong, after International Commerce Centre, Two International Finance Centre (2 IFC) and Central Plaza. It was the tallest building in Hong Kong and Asia from 1990 to 1992, and it was the first supertall skyscraper outside the United States, the first to break the 305 m (1,000 ft) mark. It was surpassed by Central Plaza on the same island in 1992.

Construction began on 18 April 1985 on the former site of Murray House, and was completed five years later in 1990. Sporting a steel-column design, the building is accessible from the MTR's Central station. The building lies between Cotton Tree Drive and Garden Road.

== History ==
=== Site ===
The 6,700 m^{2} (72,000 sq ft) site on which the building is constructed was formerly the location of Murray House. After its brick-by-brick relocation to Stanley, the site was sold by the Government for "only HK$1 billion" in August 1982 amidst growing concern over the future of Hong Kong in the run-up to the transfer of sovereignty.

The building was initially built by the Hong Kong Branch of the Bank of China; its Garden Road entrance continues to display the name "Bank of China", rather than BOCHK. The top four and the bottom 19 stories are used by the Bank, while the other floors are leased out. Ownership has since been transferred to BOCHK, although the Bank of China has leased back several floors for use by its own operations in Hong Kong.

=== Favouritism controversy ===
The Government had apparently given preferential treatment to Chinese companies, and was again criticised for the apparent preferential treatment to the BOCHK.

The price paid was half the amount of the 6,250 m^{2} (67,274 sq ft) Admiralty II plot, for which the MTR Corporation paid HK$1.82 billion in cash. The BOC would make initial payment of $60 million, with the rest payable over 13 years at 6% interest. The announcement of the sale was also poorly handled, and a dive in business confidence ensued. The Hang Seng Index fell 80 points, and the HK$ lost 1.5% of its value the next day.

=== Construction ===
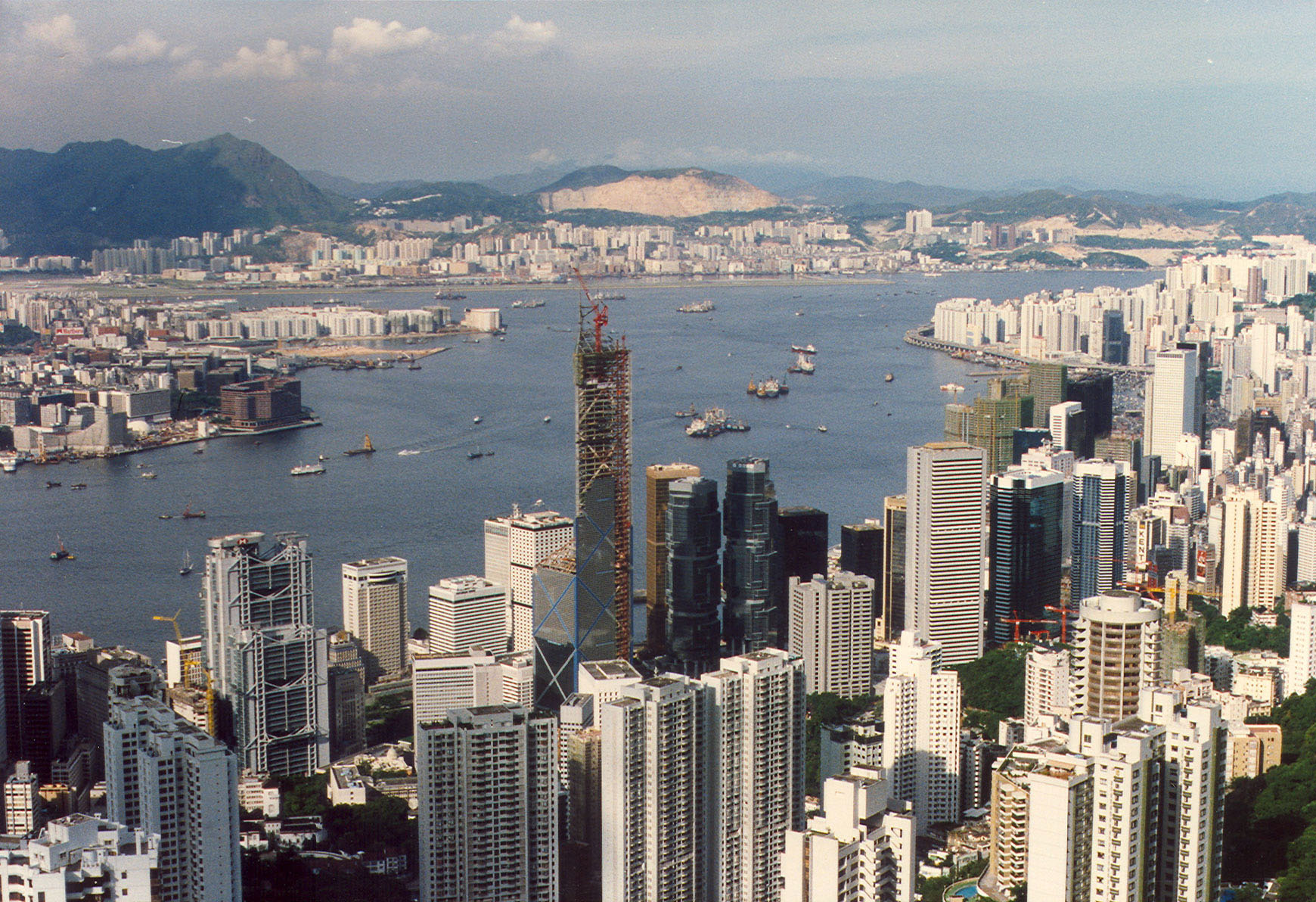
The Bank of China Building under construction in 1988

The tower was built by Japanese contractor Kumagai Gumi. Superstructure work began in May 1986. The tower is a steel-frame structure.

The Tiananmen Square protests of 1989 interrupted publicity surrounding the building's design and construction. A press conference scheduled for 24 May 1989, two weeks before the incident, was intended to show off the building's "designer socialist furnishings", but was called off as the student demonstrations in Beijing escalated. The public relations firm that organised the conference explained to the South China Morning Post that "under the circumstances, it has been decided to stop any publicity to do with the Bank of China."

Once developed, gross floor area was expected to be 100,000 m^{2} (1,076,391 sq ft). The original project was intended for completion on the auspicious date of 8 August 1988. However, owing to project delays, groundbreaking took place in March 1985, almost two years late, with the completion also facing a nearly two-year delay. It was topped out in 1989, and occupied on 15 June 1990.

== Architecture ==
Massing model showing the shape of the Bank of China Tower. The labels correspond to the number of 'X' shapes on each outward facing side.

Designed by Pritzker Prize-winning architect I. M. Pei, the building is 315.0 m (1,033.5 ft) high with two masts reaching 367.4 m (1,205.4 ft) high. The 72-storey building is located near Central MTR station. This was the tallest building in Hong Kong and Asia from 1990 to 1992, the first building outside the United States to break the 305 m (1,000 ft) mark, and the first composite space frame high-rise building. That also means it was the tallest outside the United States from its completion year, 1990. It is now the fourth tallest skyscraper in Hong Kong, after International Commerce Centre, Two International Finance Centre and Central Plaza.

A small observation deck on the 43rd floor of the building was once open to the public, but is now closed.

The whole structure is supported by the four steel columns at the corners of the building, with the triangular frameworks transferring the weight of the structure onto these four columns. It is covered with glass curtain walls. Structural engineer Leslie E. Robertson, best known for his work on the Twin Towers of the original World Trade Center, provided the structural engineering design, while Jaros, Baum & Bolles was the mechanical, electrical and plumbing engineer.

While its distinctive look makes it one of Hong Kong's most identifiable landmarks today, it was the source of some controversy at one time, as the bank is the only major building in Hong Kong to have bypassed the convention of consulting with feng shui masters on matters of design prior to construction.

The building has been criticised by some practitioners of feng shui for its sharp edges and its negative symbolism by the numerous 'X' shapes in its original design, though Pei modified the design to some degree before construction following this feedback. The building's profile from some angles resembles that of a meat cleaver and it is sometimes referred to as a "vertical knife". This earned it the nickname 一把刀 (yaat baa dou) in Cantonese, literally meaning 'one knife'.

== Transport ==
The Bank of China Tower can be accessed by the Mass Transit Railway (MTR) by walking through Chater Garden from Central station Exit J2.

== In popular culture ==
- In the 1988 film Police Story 2, the building was shown during its construction
- In the 2012 film Battleship, the building is torn in half by a crashing alien spaceship and its spire falls into the streets of Hong Kong, killing many people.
- In Star Trek: Voyager, the building is used as the exterior of Starfleet Communications Research Center.
- The building is seen on the attraction It's a Small World at Hong Kong Disneyland.
- The building was featured in the film Transformers: Age of Extinction, where Bumblebee and Dinobot Strafe makes their final stand against the Decepticon drone Stinger.
- The building appears in Cardcaptor Sakura: The Movie for several scenes.
- The building was featured in the city-building games SimCity 3000 and SimCity 4 as a placeable landmark.
- The building was featured in the 2017 mobile game TheoTown as a vanilla landmark.
- The building (renamed to Mortensen Electric) appears in the 2012 action-adventure video game Sleeping Dogs in the Central District.
- In the 2021 movie Godzilla vs. Kong, the building is featured prominently throughout the battle between Godzilla and Kong in Hong Kong. Despite being in close proximity to the battle, the tower is not destroyed and is still standing at the end of the battle.
- The building is present in the Dockside track in the videogame Burnout 3: Takedown

== See also ==
- Bank of China Building, the old headquarters of the Bank of China
- List of tallest buildings in Hong Kong
- List of buildings and structures in Hong Kong
- List of tallest freestanding structures
