= Kincheng Banking Corporation =

Former bank in China

Kincheng Banking Corporation or Kincheng Bank (Chinese: 金城銀行) was a bank in Hong Kong. It was established in Tianjin in 1917 by Zhou Zuomin (Chinese: 周作民, a native of Huai'an in Jiangsu), Ni Sichong (Chinese: 倪嗣衝, Anhui General Commander) and Wang Zhilong (Chinese: 王郅隆, Ni's treasurer). Kincheng Banking Corporation, Yien Yieh Commercial Bank, Continental Bank and China & South Sea Bank were called "Four Northern Banks" in 1920s in China.

In 1952, it was grouped into the Joint Office of Joint Public-Private Banks with 8 other Chinese banks. In 2001, it was merged to form Bank of China (Hong Kong).

== See others ==
- Four Northern Banks
