= Haiwen & Partners =

Chinese law firm

- Headquarters: Beijing, China
- No. of offices: Four
- No. of lawyers: Approximately 200
- Major practice areas: M&A; Dispute Resolution; Antitrust/Competition; Intellectual Property; Media; Tax; Capital Markets
- Date founded: 1992; 34 years ago (Beijing)
- Website: http://www.haiwen-law.com/en/

Haiwen & Partners (simplified Chinese: 海问律师事务所; traditional Chinese: 海問律師事務所) is a Chinese law firm focused on cross-border securities, M&A transactions, private equity, general corporate and commercial dispute resolution practice. Haiwen is a fully integrated partnership with a modified lockstep compensation system.

Haiwen currently has around 200 lawyers in total working at its Beijing, Shanghai, Shenzhen and Hong Kong offices.

Compared with most major PRC law firms, Haiwen & Partners maintains a relatively small number of attorneys and focuses on capital market and M&A practices. Haiwen & Partners is one of the "Red Circle" law firms in China.

== History ==
Haiwen & Partners was founded in May 1992. The founding partners of Haiwen include Duke Law School graduate Gao Xiqing, who was the first Chinese citizen to pass the New York Bar exam and later became the President and Chief Investment Officer of the China Investment Corporation.

== Recent Transactions ==
- In 2017, Haiwen & Partners worked on Jianpu Technology's offering of 22,500,000 ADSs at NYSE.
- In 2015, Haiwen & Partners advised China International Capital Corporation Limited's 1 billion Hong Kong IPO.
- In recent years, Haiwen & Partners began to expand its practice into Media, Intellectual Property, and Entertainment Law. Recent notable projects advised by Haiwen & Partners include deal on opening the first Universal Studios theme park in China, and IMAX China's Hong Kong IPO in 2015.
- In July 2024, Haiwen & Partners was one of the six law firms advising on Chenqi Technology's HKD 1.05 billion (US$134 million) IPO in Hong Kong.

== Practice Areas ==
Haiwen's Beijing headquarters in the Fortune Plaza in Beijing.

- M&A and Corporate
- Dispute Resolution
- Antitrust/Competition
- Intellectual Property
- Media
- Tax
- Capital Markets/Securities

== See also ==
- Chinese law
- Legal History of China
