= Yien Yieh Commercial Bank =

Former Hong Kong bank

Yien Yieh Commercial Bank (Chinese: 鹽業銀行) was a bank in Hong Kong. It was established in Beijing in 1915 by Zhang Zhenfang (Chinese: 張鎮芳), the cousin of Yuan Shikai, to support the specialized salt industry by providing official funds under government supervision. Yien Yieh Commercial Bank, Continental Bank, Kincheng Banking Corporation and China & South Sea Bank were called "four northern banks" in 1920s in China.

In 1952, it was grouped into the "Joint Office of Joint Public-Private Banks" with eight other Chinese banks. In 2001, it was merged to form Bank of China (Hong Kong).

== See also ==
- Salt in Chinese history
- Four Northern Banks
