= Hua Chiao Commercial Bank =

- Native name: 華僑商業銀行
- Industry: Banking
- Founded: 1962; 64 years ago
- Successor: Bank of China (2001)
- Headquarters: British Hong Kong
- Parent: Bank of China Group (1965–2001)

Hua Chiao Commercial Bank
- Traditional Chinese: 華僑商業銀行
Transcriptions
Yue: Cantonese
- Yale Romanization: Wàah kìuh sēung yihp ngàhn hòhng
- Jyutping: Wa4 kiu4 soeng1 yip6 ngan4 honh4

Hua Chiao Commercial Bank (Chinese: 華僑商業銀行) was a bank in Hong Kong. It was established in Hong Kong in 1962 by several Indonesian Chinese. After 1965, it became a member of Bank of China Group. It was involved in remittance and deposit account businesses, but it switched to export and import trading loan, international settlement after the 1970s. In 2001, it was merged to form Bank of China (Hong Kong).
