= Three Southern Banks =

Former banks in China

Three Southern Banks (Chinese: 南三行) referred to the three most capitalized commercial banks in the south of Yangtze River in the Republic of China in the 1920s, in contrast to the Four Northern Banks (北四行) of Northern China. With their headquarters in Shanghai, the three banks cooperated to form the group.

The three banks were The National Commercial Bank (浙江興業銀行), the Chekiang Industrial Bank (浙江實業銀行) and the Shanghai Commercial and Savings Bank (上海商業儲蓄銀行).
