= Liu Jinbao =

Chinese businessman

- Education: University of International Business and Economics, Beijing
- Title: former CEO of Bank of China (Hong Kong)
- Criminal charges: improper lending

Liu Jinbao (simplified Chinese: 刘金宝) was the former CEO of Bank of China (Hong Kong) Limited and vice-chairman of Bank of China from 1998 to 2003.

== Biography ==
Liu Jinbao graduated in 1976 from the University of International Business and Economics in Beijing. He joined the Bank of China right after graduation. He was sent to work in London in 1977, climbed up the corporate ladder while working in the Shanghai offices from 1981 to 1997 (became Shanghai's general manager in 1994), and became head of the Hong Kong operations in 1997.

Liu Jinbao was appointed director of the Bank of China in September 1998.

== Controversies ==
Liu Jinbao began to be investigated by the Chinese and US authorities in 2000 for improper lending in Shanghai along with Shanghai politician Chau Ching-ngai.

Liu Jinbao was abruptly transferred back to Beijing to become vice-chairman of Bank of China in May 2003. Investigations subsequently found Liu to have "committed economic crimes" in connection with his previous appointment as the head of the Shanghai branch of the Bank of China. Liu was subsequently dismissed from his post.

Liu, along with three other senior managers, were also alleged to have made "unauthorised distribution for personal purposes" of funds belong to the Bank of China before BOCHK was established. The Standard speculated that the amount involved was HK$30 million.

In May 2003, he resigned from the Exchange Fund Advisory Committee of Hong Kong. In February 2004, the board of directors of the Bank of China voted Liu Jinbao out of the board.

Chinese court has sentenced him to a 2-year suspended death sentence.

In November 2006, he admitted to spending close to £300,000 on plastic surgery for his mistress, to make her look like his high school sweetheart.

== Publications ==
- Echoes from finance, 1994
