= Sin Hua Bank =

Sin Hua Trust and Savings Bank Limited
- Trade name: Sin Hua Bank
- Native name: 新華銀行
- Industry: Banking, financial Services
- Founded: 1914
- Defunct: 2001
- Fate: acquired by Bank of China
- Headquarters: Beijing, Shanghai
- Owner: Bank of China

Sin Hua Bank (Chinese: 新華銀行; pinyin: Xīnhuá Yínháng), or Sin Hua Trust and Savings Bank Limited, was a Chinese bank established in Beijing in 1914. It later moved its headquarters to Shanghai.

Sin Hua established its Hong Kong branch in 1947 and was renamed to Sin Hua Trust, Savings and Commercial Bank Limited in 1948. It moved its headquarters back to Beijing in 1980. It merged (along with nine others) with Hong Kong–based Po Sang Bank in 2001 to form Bank of China (Hong Kong).

Between 1989 (after the Hong Kong branch of the Bank of China moved to the new Bank of China Tower) and 2001, its headquarters were located at the Bank of China Building in Central.
