= TheoTown =

2015 city-building video game

- Developer: Lobby
- Publisher: Blueflower
- Platforms: Android, iOS, Windows, MacOS, Linux
- Release: Android: April 11, 2015 iOS : May 20, 2019 Windows, MacOS, Linux : June 5, 2019
- Genre: City-building
- Modes: Single-player, Online multiplayer

TheoTown is a city-building game developed and published by indie studio Blueflower (stylized in all lowercase). TheoTown is played via an isometric 2.5D perspective and features pixel graphics. The objective of the game is to build a city and manage its finances.

Players build cities on single square tiles or multiple separate square tiles (known as a region) by building infrastructure such as roads, bridges and public services. The game features user-created plugins, which allows players to share and use others’ creations in their own city.

As of April 2026, TheoTown has amassed over 10 million downloads on the Google Play Store.

== Gameplay ==
The core gameplay of TheoTown is to plan, build and manage a city. The game is split into four modes; easy mode, middle mode, hard mode, and sandbox mode. Players in the first three modes are bound by financial constraints and must avoid going into debt. The latter of which allows to players to have unlimited money and resources.

The player is given a map tile that can be generated from predefined names (known as “seeds”) and can be customised using terrain tools such as creating hills or adding land. Land can be zoned for buildings. Zoning be divided into three different categories; residential zones, commercial zones, and industrial zones (which include farmland and harbours). Infrastructure can be built along with other services to satisfy residents’ demands. Taxes can be adjusted to adapt to the city budget.

Screenshot of Theotown gameplay

A “city rank” indicates the level of development in the city. As higher ranks are unlocked, new buildings and infrastructure become available to the player. Residences, commercial buildings, and industrial buildings also have levels. This level is represented by the number of Theons (₮), the in-game currency. Poor inhabitants and businesses are represented by one Theon (₮), middle-class ones are represented by two Theons (₮₮), and rich ones are represented by three Theons (₮₮₮). Inhabitants and businesses become richer when provided better services; they also pay more taxes.

Regions are a collection of individual map tiles that are separate from each other (i.e. you cannot see or build on adjacent tiles). Their appearance is also determined by a “seed”. Players have the option to connect roads, electrical connections and water pipes between the map tiles to share resources. Online regions are where two or more players collaborate on their owned tiles to form a region.

To effectively manage the city, players must provide public services such as law enforcement, healthcare, fire services, and parks among others. Failure to do so may result in disasters such as riots, pandemics and fires. Natural disasters such as earthquakes and tornadoes can also occur.

== Development ==
The City-Project, developed by German game developer Cristian Weigel, was the precursor to TheoTown using assets that later appeared in TheoTown. A 2010 Youtube video on the Youtube channel of development collaborator Fabian Miltenburger (under the alias of “Lobby”) shows The City-Project was a work-in-progress city builder reminiscent of TheoTown.

During an interview with Eurogamer, Miltenburger estimated the development time of TheoTown to be “about two years”. He also stated that the development team “did not use a framework that would have allowed [them] to bring the game to other platforms”, resulting in the porting of TheoTown from Android to iOS and Steam to be “challenging”.

In the same interview, Miltenburger said that the name for the game was conceived from the fact that the original idea was from someone who called themselves “Theo”.

=== Release ===
The first version released to the public was on Android in Alpha on April 16, 2015. After multiple updates, iOS support was introduced on May 20, 2019, with Windows, MacOS and Linux support introduced on June 5, 2019. As of June 2026, the most recent major update was the Transportation Update, which revamped the pre-existing transport system.

== Reception ==
TheoTown received a 5/5 rating from TouchArcade, naming it their Game of the Week in May 2019 and included it among their best mobile games of 2019. Jarod Nelson of TouchArcade noted that it had "excellent animations" but could be somewhat overwhelming when first starting to play. Campbell Bird of 148Apps.com found TheoTown to be an "incredibly detailed game". Bird also stated that TheoTown had "very rough edges" and gave the game a 3.5/5.

=== Popularity in Indonesia ===
TheoTown gained popularity on Indonesian social media in January 2026. One of the reasons for the rise in popularity was that players utilised the game as a way to comment on and critique government actions and public policies. This popularity was further boosted when live streamer Windah Basudara played the game live on stream.
