= National Industrial Bank of China =

Defunct bank

National Industrial Bank of China (NIBC; simplified Chinese: 中国实业银行; traditional Chinese: 中國實業銀行) was a bank established in September 1915 or 1919 in Tianjin. It moved its headquarters to Shanghai in 1932, into a building which became an icon for the bank and was displayed on its banknotes, built in 1929 at the corner of Huqiu and Beijing roads. That building, designed by Atkinson & Dallas, was renovated in the early 2010s by David Chipperfield Architects to become part of the Rockbund Art Museum complex.

The NIBC provided funding for the KMT government in Shanghai's various projects around the city, and also issued bank notes. It was occasionally referred to as one of the "four small banks" (together with the Commercial Bank of China, Ningpo Commercial and Savings Bank also known as Siming Bank, and Sin Hua Bank), in contrast to the "four big banks" that were the Central Bank of China, Bank of China, Bank of Communications, and Farmers Bank of China.

The NIBC merged with Bank of Communications in 1935, although its branch in Hong Kong remained in operations under the National Industrial Bank name until 1954.

The bank's former manager Liu Huizhi was a collector of antiques and rare books, and in the early 1930s financed a dedicated building to host his collection, which still survives in Shanghai.

== Buildings ==
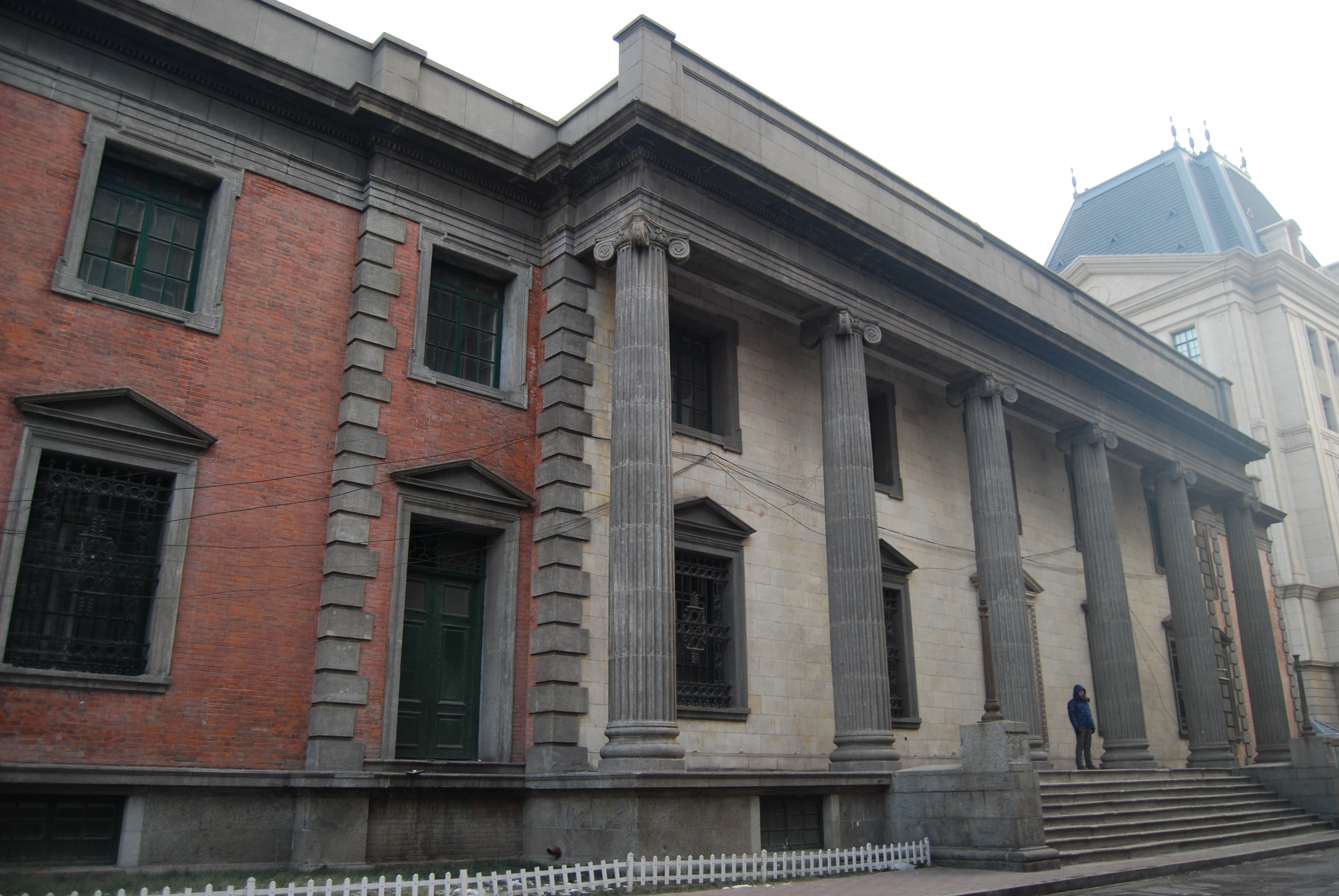
First NIBC headquarters building in Tianjin

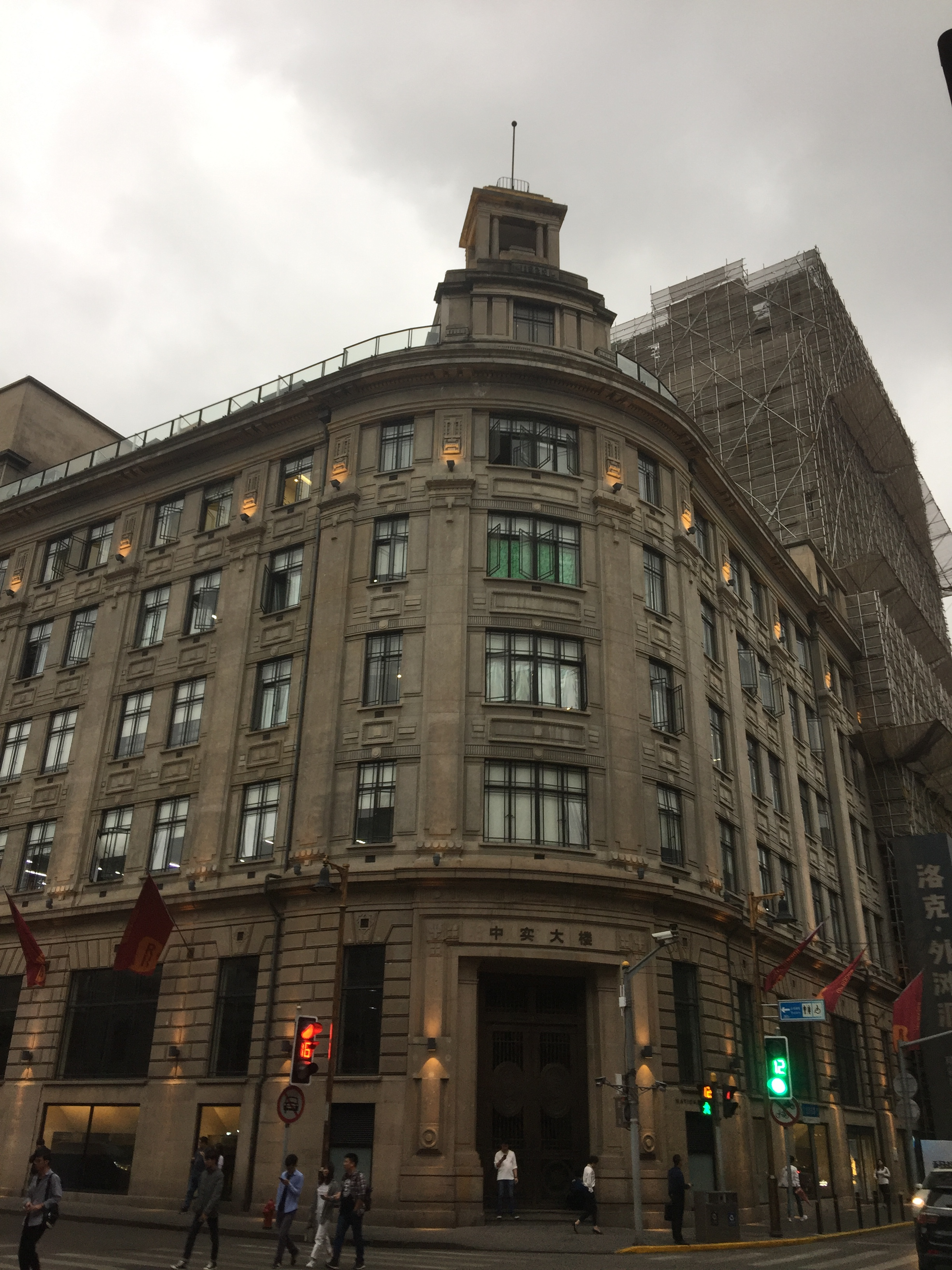
Second NIBC headquarters building in Shanghai

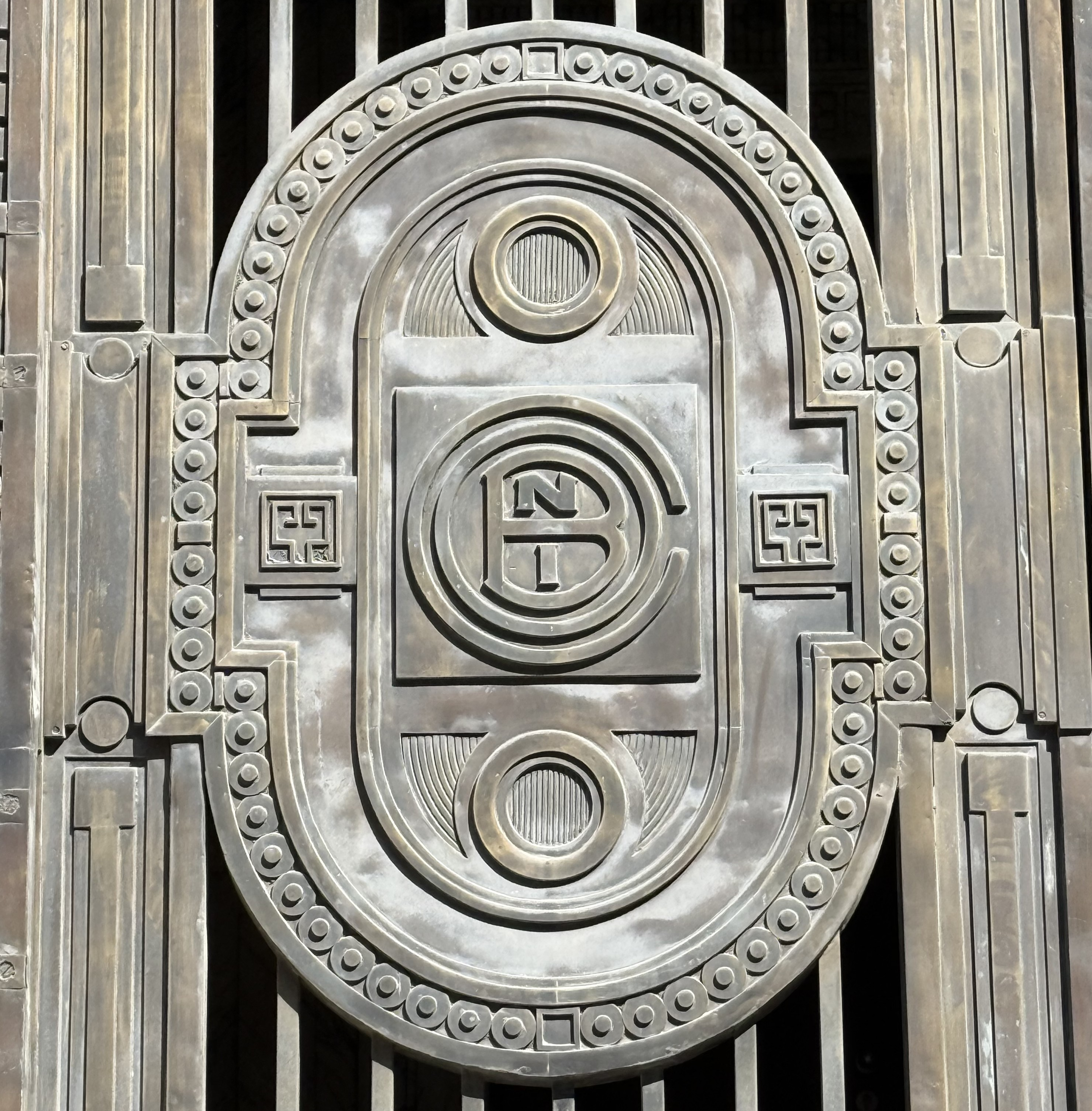
NIBC monogram at the entrance of the Shanghai building

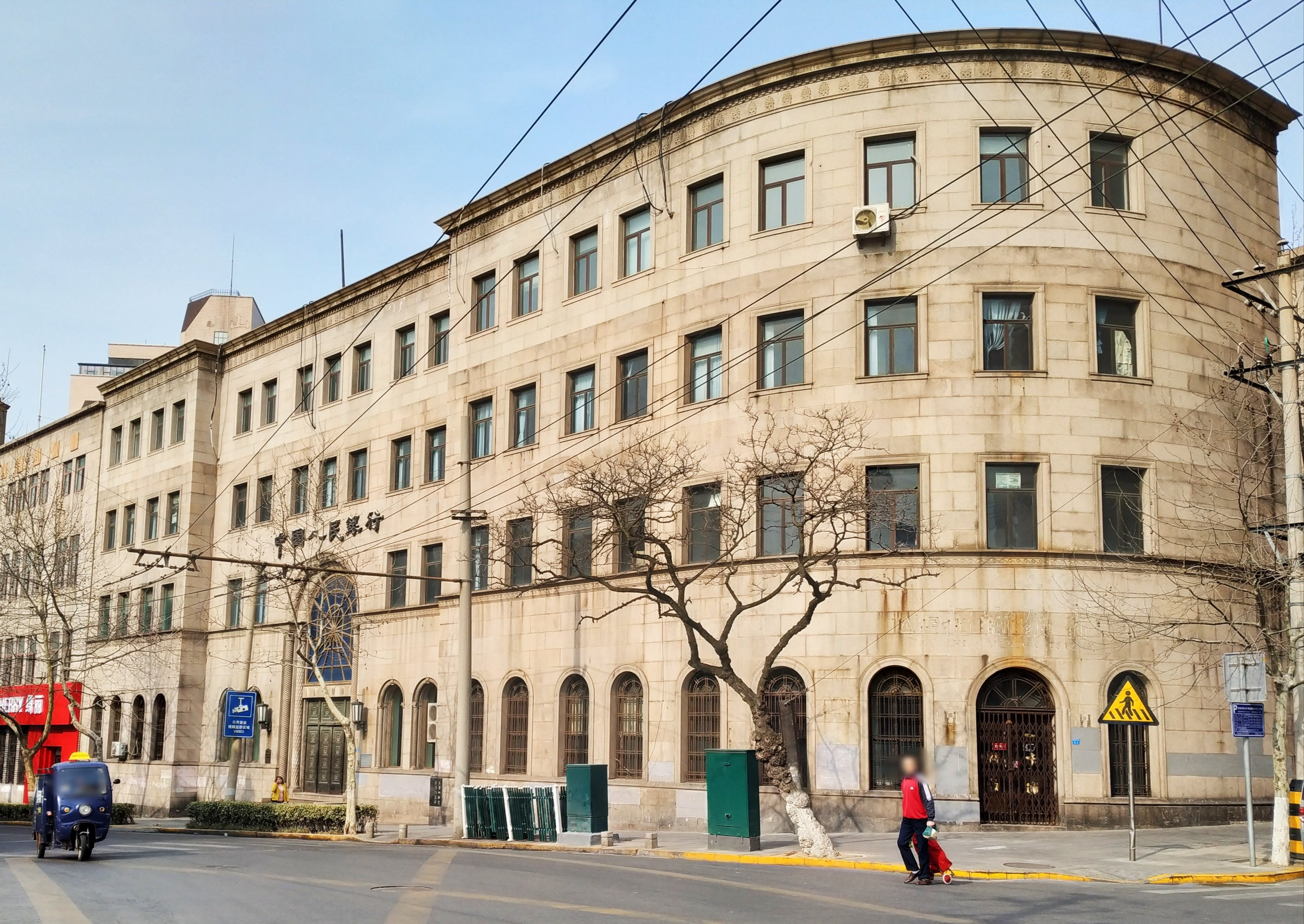
Former NIBC branch building in Qingdao

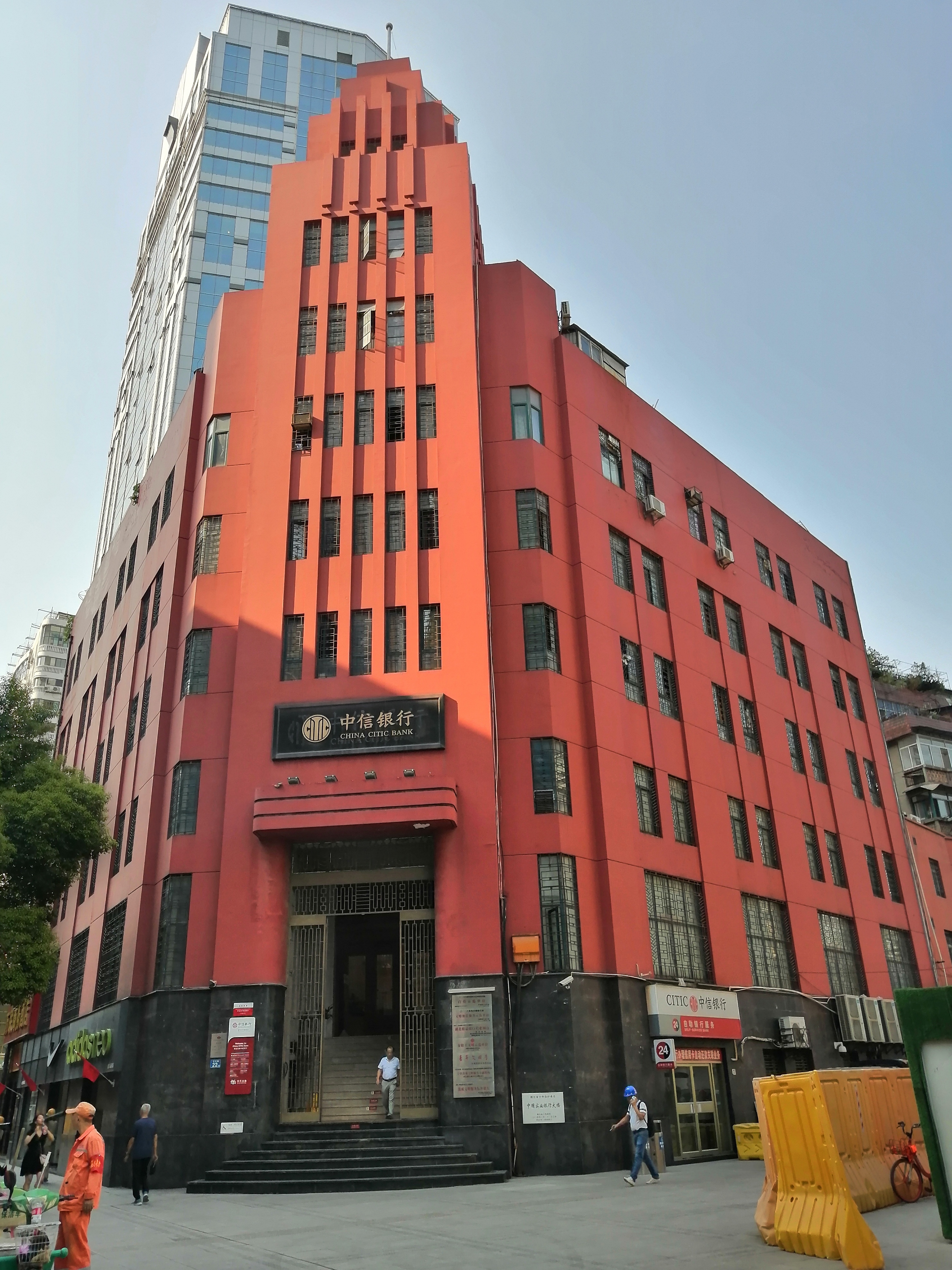
Former NIBC branch building in Hankou

== Banknotes ==
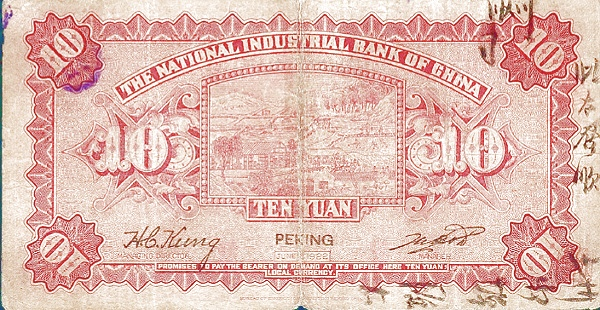
10 Yuan (1922)

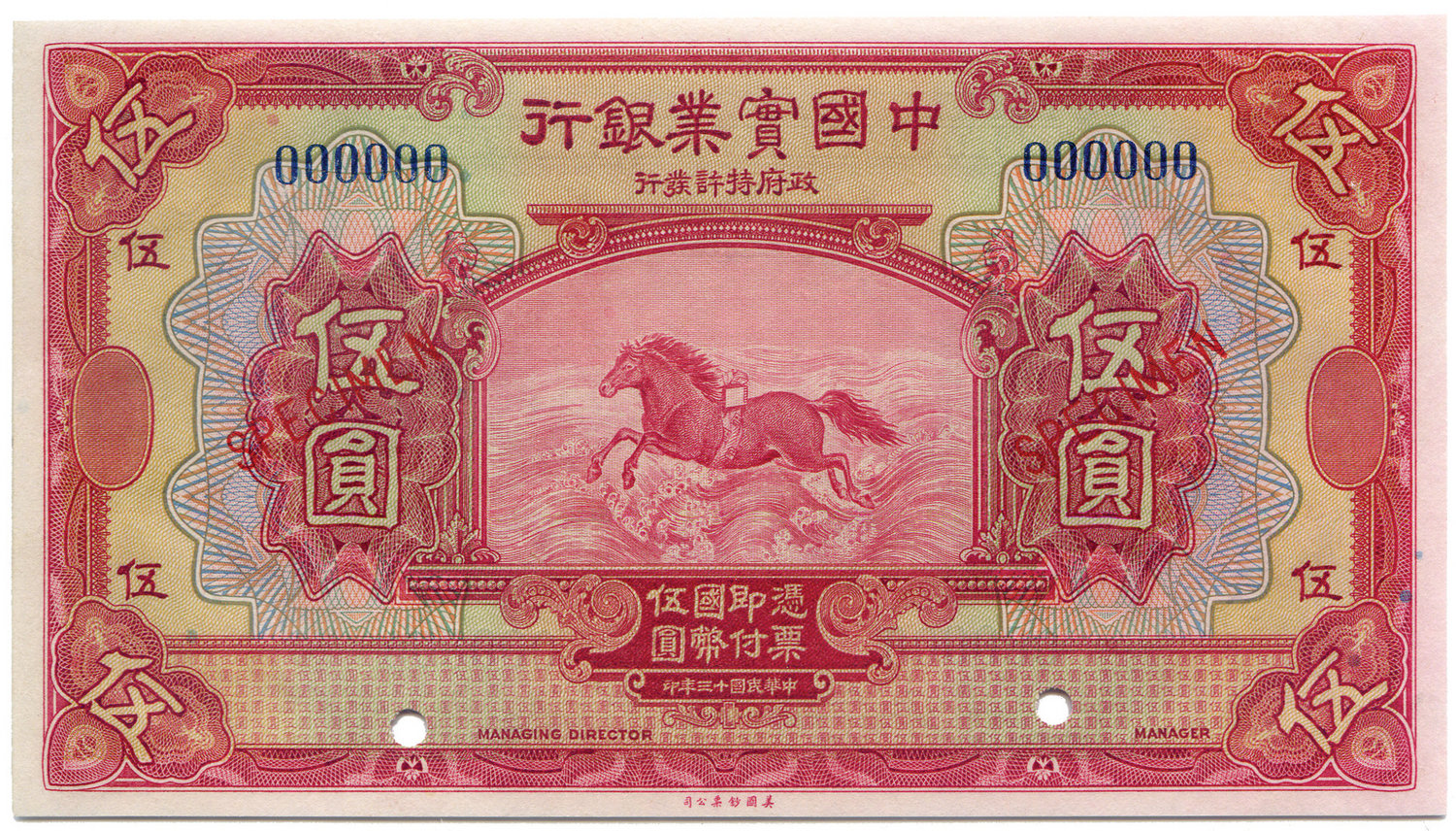
5 Yuan (1924)

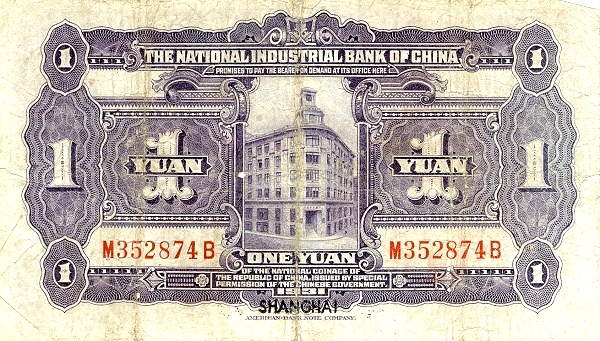
1 Yuan (1931), depicting the bank's Shanghai headquarters building
