= Po Sang Bank =

- Company type: subsidiary
- Industry: financial services
- Founded: 1949 in British Hong Kong
- Founder: Chinese Central Government
- Defunct: 2001 in Hong Kong
- Fate: merged with other banks of Bank of China Group
- Successor: Bank of China (Hong Kong)
- Headquarters: Hong Kong
- Services: banking
- Parent: Bank of China Group

Chinese name
- Traditional Chinese: 寶生銀行
Transcriptions
Yue: Cantonese
- Yale Romanization: Bóu sāang ngàhn hòhng
- Jyutping: Bou2 sang1 ngan4 hong4

Po Sang Bank was a bank established in 1949 in British Hong Kong. All other banks operated by the Bank of China in the territory were merged into the legal person of Po Sang Bank in 2001, and the legal person was renamed to Bank of China (Hong Kong).

One branch of the Po Sang was involved in what was then the largest holdup in the history of Hong Kong in 1974 and another in 1979 (and later involved HKP officer and SDU member Yee Wai-ming).
