= Kwangtung Provincial Bank =

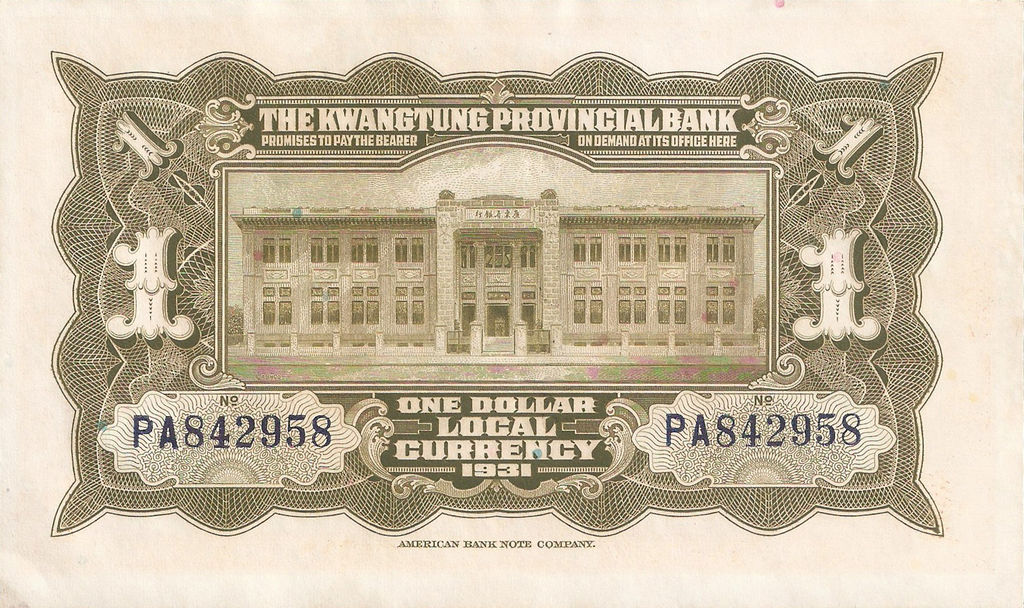
Provincial Bank of Kwantung building depicted on the reverse of a 1931 1 Dollar local currency Banknote.

The Kwangtung Provincial Bank (Chinese: 廣東省銀行) was a bank latterly based in Hong Kong, also known as the Provincial Bank of Kwangtung Province. The largest of the provincial banks, there were however a succession of at least seven distinct organisations trading as the Kwangtung Provincial Bank from 1904 through 1949, with Chinese operations suspended in 1950–51; absorbed into the People's Bank of China following the establishment of the People's Republic of China. The remainder of the bank continued in operation until 2001 when it was taken over by the Bank of China (Hong Kong).

== Banknote Issue ==
The first known banknote issues appeared in 1913, through to 1922, all printed by the American Banknote Company, New York. Subsequent issues are of 1923 and 1925 as the Central Bank of China. During the 1930s, three separate issues of currency all dated 1931 were issued by the bank. Small change (10, 20 and 50 cents) issues appeared in 1934 and 1935. Larger notes of $1 to $10 were issued between 1935 and 1940 after which the bank was taken over by the invading Japanese. Following the defeat of Japan in 1945, the bank was re-established and issued one final series of currency in 1949 in denominations of 1, 5, 10 and 50 cents, and 1, 5, 10 and 100 Yuan.

Two million dollars' worth of the 1918 notes were withdrawn by the bank under the orders of Dr Sun Yatsen, to fund military activities during 1921–22.

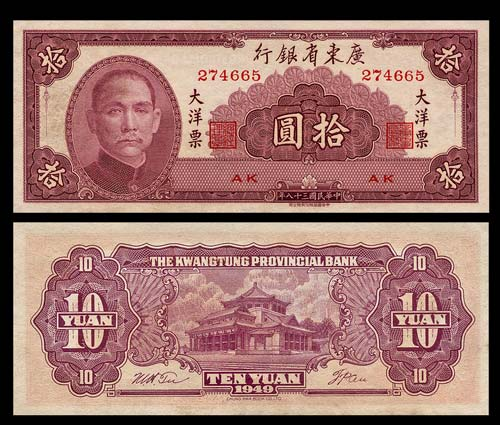
1949 10 Yuan Banknote.

== History ==
- 1924: The bank was re-established in Guangzhou by T. V. Soong, the brother-in-law of Sun Yat-sen, as the Central Bank (Chinese: 中央銀行). It was the first central bank established in China.
- 1929: It was renamed to Kwangtung Central Bank (Chinese: 廣東中央銀行) so as to prevent confusion with the national Central Bank of China founded at Nanjing in 1928. Its role was reverted from central bank to provincial government bank. Hong Kong branches were also established.
- 1932: It was restructured as the Kwangtung Provincial Bank.
- 1949: Last banknote issue.
- 2001: The bank was merged into Bank of China (Hong Kong).

== Bibliography ==
- Ward D. Smith; Brian Matravers (1 June 1970). Chinese banknotes. Menlo Park, California: Shirjieh Publishers. ISBN 9780912496122. OCLC 475185214.
