= Xu Jingren =

Chinese entrepreneur and politician (1944–2021)

- 徐镜人
- Born: 15 September 1944; Taizhou, Jiangsu, China
- Died: 12 July 2021 (aged 76)
- Education: B.A.
- Occupations: Pharmaceutical executive, philanthropist
- Children: 2

Xu Jingren (Chinese: 徐镜人; September 15, 1944 – July 12, 2021) was the chairman and president of Yangtze River Pharmaceutical Group, National People's Congress delegate and honorary vice-minister in China's Ministry of Health. Xu had been an outspoken research leader in China, where he had frequently called for labor reform and business regulation. As of 2021, his estimated net worth was US$4.6 billion, one of four family members to be listed among the world's wealthiest. He died on 12 July 2021.

== Personal life ==
The family were noted victims of the 2015 Chinese stock market crash, during which they lost approximately 40% of their previously estimated US$8 billion combined net worth. Despite this, Xu Jingren and his relatives continue to be mentioned as one of China's top "vampire billionaire" families with majority investments abroad. Notable international initiatives include the 2017 YRPG subsidiary merger and rebranding of global drug manufacturer ShangPharma by group CEO Michael Hui and board vice-chair Aaron Shang, with a stated intent of expanding North American operations leading to development of San Francisco-based venture portfolio ShangPharma Innovation.
