= Gao Xiqing =

Chinese lawyer and former CIC president

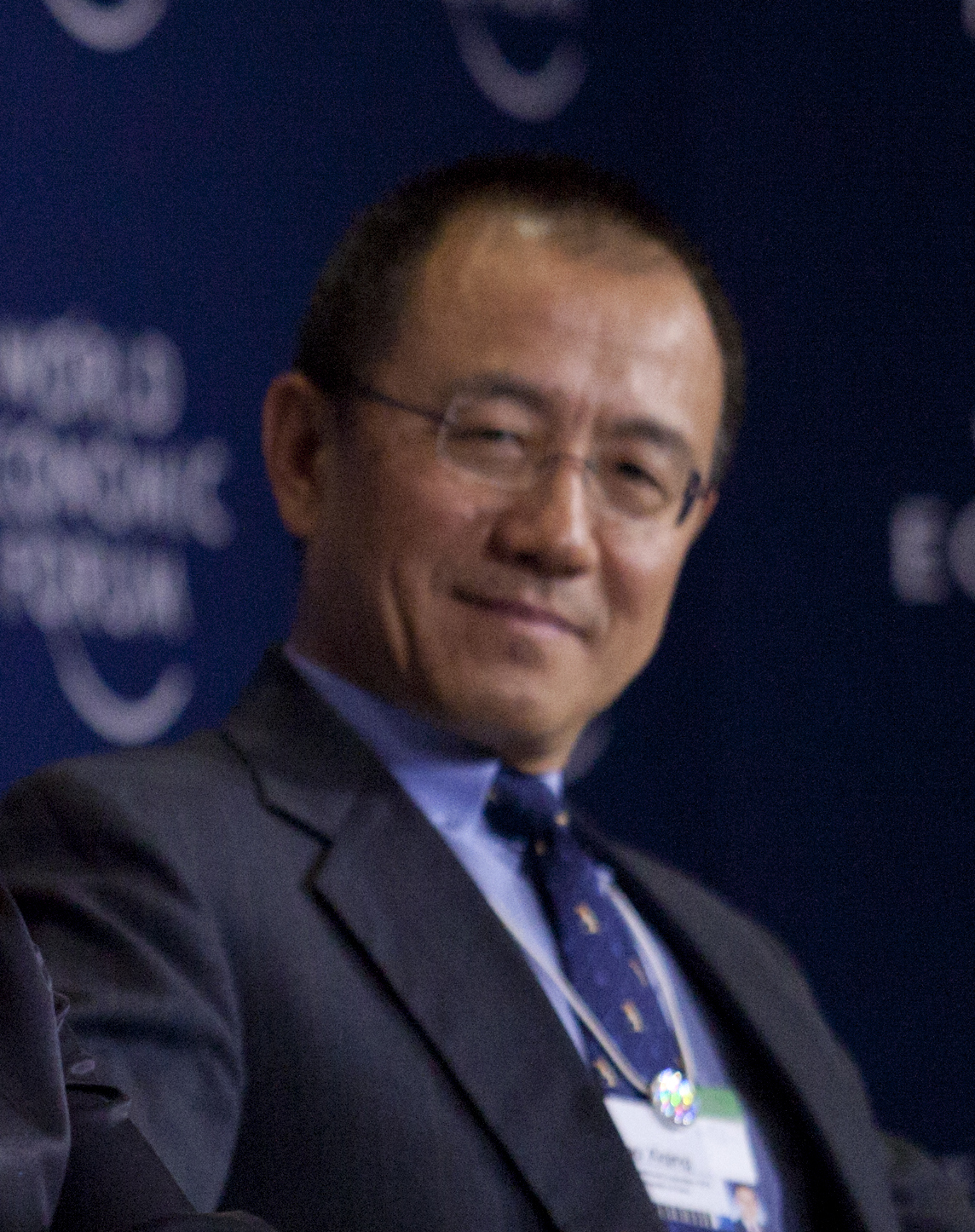
- Gao at the World Economic Forum on Africa in 2012
- Born: September 1953 (age 72)
- Education: UIBE (B.A.); UIBE (LL.M.); Duke Law School (J.D.)
- Known for: CIO of CIC

Gao Xiqing (simplified Chinese: 高西庆; traditional Chinese: 高西慶; pinyin: Gāo Xīqìng) (born September 1953) is the former Vice Chairman, President and Chief Investment Officer of the China Investment Corporation, China's largest sovereign wealth fund.

== Early life and career ==
Gao obtained a bachelor of arts (1978) and a Master in Law (1981) from the University of International Business in Beijing and obtained a law degree in 1986 from Duke University's Law School and became the first Chinese citizen to pass the New York State Bar Exam. For the next two years following graduation from Duke, Gao worked as an associate at the Wall Street law firm Mudge Rose Guthrie Alexander & Ferdon (Richard Nixon's former law firm).

He then returned to China in 1988. From 1992-1995 he served as the General Counsel and the Director of Public Offerings of China Securities Regulatory Commission (CSRC). Then, from 1997–1999, he served as Deputy Chief Executive at the HK-Macao Regional Office of the Bank of China. He later served as the Vice Chairman of the China Security Regulatory Commission (CSRC) and the Vice-Chairman for the National Council for Social Security Fund (SSF).

Between October 2007 and February 2014, Gao served as the President and Chief Investment Officer of the China Investment Corporation (CIC). He led CIC's negotiations to provide $5.5 billion in US investment bank Morgan Stanley, at which time it was suffering from a massive trading loss. At one point of the negotiations, the pain in Gao's torso was so acute that he continued the talks with US executives while lying on the floor.

Gao currently serves on the Duke University Board of Trustees.

== In popular culture ==
Gao was portrayed by Les J.N. Mau in the 2011 docudrama Too Big to Fail.
