= Bank of China (Hong Kong) =

Intermediately Chinese state-owned bank in Hong Kong

Bank of China (Hong Kong) Limited

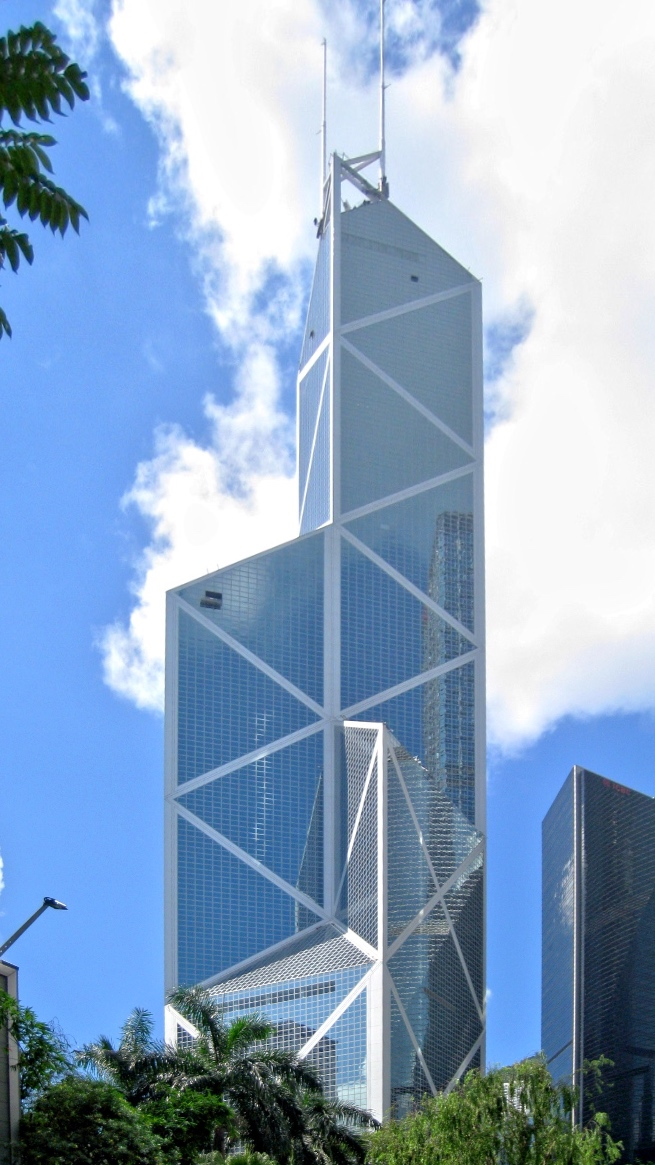
- Bank of China Tower in Hong Kong
- Native name: 中國銀行(香港)有限公司
- Type: Public (subsidiary)
- Traded as: SEHK: 2388; Hang Seng Index component; (as BOC Hong Kong (Holdings))
- Industry: Financial services
- Founded: 16 October 1964; 62 years ago (incorporation of the legal entity Po Sang Bank); 1 October 2001; 25 years ago (current name)
- Headquarters: Bank of China Tower, Central, Hong Kong
- Key people: Ge Haijiao, Chairman; Sun Yu, Vice chairman and Chief Executive
- Products: Retail banking; Corporate banking; investment banking; insurance; private banking; private equity; mortgage loans; credit cards; investment management; wealth management; asset management; mutual funds; exchange-traded funds; index funds
- Revenue: ▲HK$77.019 billion (2025)
- Operating income: ▲HK$50.532 billion (2025)
- Net income: ▲HK$41.189 billion (2025)
- Total assets: ▲HK$4.489809 trillion (2025)
- Total equity: ▲HK$363.475 billion (2025)
- Number of employees: ▲15,585 FTE (2025)
- Parent: Bank of China (66.06%)
- Subsidiaries: Bank of China (Thai); Bank of China (Malaysia)
- Website: bochk.com

Bank of China (Hong Kong) Limited
- Traditional Chinese: 中國銀行(香港)有限公司
- Simplified Chinese: 中国银行(香港)有限公司
- Jyutping: zung1 gwok3 ngan4 hong4 (hoeng1 gong2) jau5 haan6 gung1 si1
Transcriptions
Standard Mandarin
- Hanyu Pinyin: Zhōngguó yínháng (Xiānggǎng) yǒuxiàn gōngsī
- Wade–Giles: Chung-kuo Yin-hang (Hsiang-kang) Yu-hsien-kung-ssŭ
Yue: Cantonese
- Jyutping: zung1 gwok3 ngan4 hong4 (hoeng1 gong2) jau5 haan6 gung1 si1

Alternative Chinese name
- Traditional Chinese: 中銀香港
- Simplified Chinese: 中银香港
- Jyutping: zung1 ngan4 hoeng1 gong2
Transcriptions
Standard Mandarin
- Hanyu Pinyin: Zhōngyín Xiānggǎng
- Wade–Giles: Chung-in Hsiang-kang
Yue: Cantonese
- Jyutping: zung1 ngan4 hoeng1 gong2

Bank of China (Hong Kong) Limited (Chinese: 中國銀行(香港)有限公司), abbreviated as BOCHK (Chinese: 中銀香港), via the Hong Kong-listed intermediate holding company BOC Hong Kong Holdings, is a subsidiary of the Bank of China (BOC). BOCHK is the second-largest commercial banking group in Hong Kong in terms of assets and customer deposits (2008 data), with more than 190 branches across Hong Kong as of the end of 2019. It is also one of the three commercial banks licensed by the Hong Kong Monetary Authority to issue banknotes for the Hong Kong dollar.

BOCHK is legally separated from BOC, its parent company; however, they maintain close relations in management and administration and co-operate in several areas, including reselling BOC's insurance and securities services. BOCHK is also the biggest member and a founder of the JETCO ATM and payment system, and the designated clearing bank in Hong Kong for transactions involving the Renminbi (RMB / CNY).

BOCHK was established on 1 October 2001 from a merger of 12 subsidiaries and associates of the BOC in Hong Kong, and listed on the Hong Kong Stock Exchange in October 2002. As of the end of 2019, the bank had HKD3,026 billion in assets and an operating profit of HKD39.8 billion. Its head office is in the Bank of China Tower in Central, Hong Kong. The head office is shared with the Hong Kong units of its parent company; it was completed in 1988 and was the first building outside North America to exceed 1,000 feet (305 m) in height.

== History ==
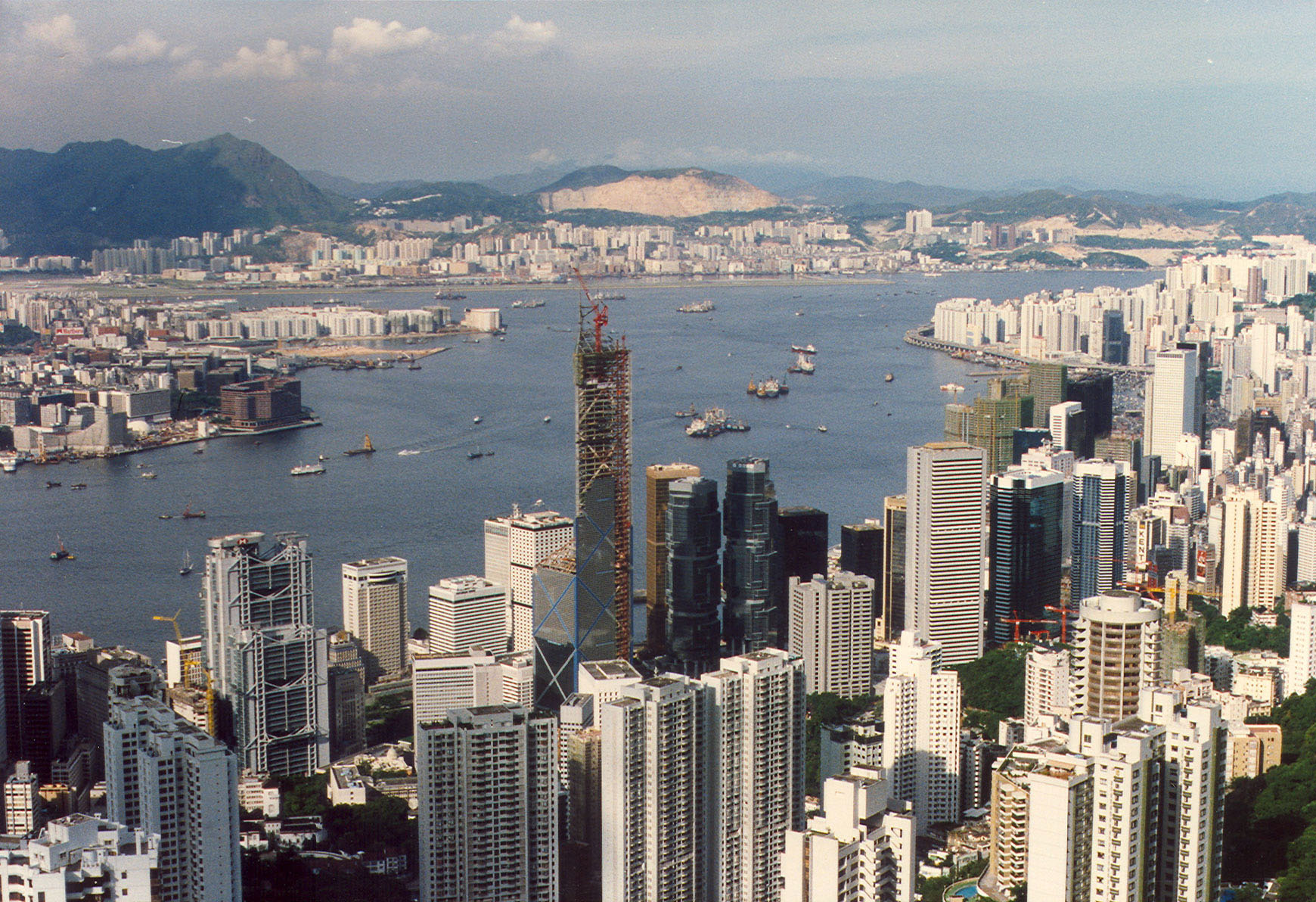
The Bank of China Building under construction in 1988

=== Bank of China Group ===
The opening of a branch of the Bank of China in Hong Kong in 1917 marked the entry of state-owned Chinese banks into the then-colony's banking sector. Other banks soon followed suit, starting with Yien Yieh Commercial Bank in 1918. By the time the People's Republic of China was established in 1949, there were 15 branches of state-owned Chinese banks in Hong Kong, plus branches of nine mainland-incorporated banks that were public-private joint ventures. In addition, the Chinese government established Po Sang Bank in 1949 and Nanyang Commercial Bank in 1950. Both of these were incorporated in Hong Kong.

In 1952, the nine public-private banks (namely, Sin Hua Bank Limited, China & South Sea Bank, Kincheng Banking Corporation, China State Bank Limited, The National Commercial Bank Limited, Yien Yieh Commercial Bank, Young Brothers Banking Corporation, Wo Sang Bank and National Industrial Bank of China) were grouped into the Joint Office of Joint Public-Private Banks. The Hong Kong branches of the last three of these nine were closed in 1954 when their parents were shut down by the central government, and management of the remaining six public-private banks were transferred to the Hong Kong and Macau Regional Office of the Bank of China in 1958. The Bank of China later took over management of the Hong Kong branches of Kwangtung Provincial Bank, Hua Chiao Commercial Bank and the Bank of Communications (HKSE: 3328).

In June 1975, the Bank of China moved to increase the capital of the public-private banks. As all of the new capital was from the Chinese government, private ownership in the public-private banks was substantially reduced, in some cases to less than 1%.

The 14 banks were rebranded as part of the Bank of China Group in the 1980s, after a common IT platform was established. Treasury and foreign currency exchange operations were also centralised. However, the individual banks retained their own management. They are now the second-largest banking group in Hong Kong.

=== Restructuring and listing ===
The Hong Kong branch of the Bank of Communications broke off from the Bank of China Group in 1998. The Bank of China Group started to restructure its operations in 1999 in preparation for an initial public offering. All minority shareholders (except for those of Chiyu) were bought out by the Bank of China. Formal plans for a restructuring received the approval of the People's Bank of China and were launched in January 2001.

The restructuring saw all operations of the mainland-incorporated group members merged into Po Sang Bank, which was then immediately renamed Bank of China (Hong Kong) Limited. Hong Kong incorporated Nanyang Commercial Bank and Chiyu Banking Corporation became subsidiaries of Bank of China (Hong Kong) Limited. Legislation was required for the merger, as Hong Kong does not allow mergers via the pooling of interests, a common procedure in the United States. The Bank of China (Hong Kong) Limited (Merger) Ordinance was approved by the Legislative Council of Hong Kong on 12 July 2001, and the merger was completed on 1 October 2001.

== Corporate structure and BOC Hong Kong Holdings ==
Bank of China (Hong Kong) is a listed company of the Stock Exchange of Hong Kong, via its parent company BOC Hong Kong (Holdings) Limited (BOCHK Holdings). The holding owned 100% shares of the bank.

Moreover, American depositary receipt of the shares of the holdings, were traded on OTC Market.

BOCHK Holdings is a constituent of the Hang Seng Index. The listing of BOCHK Holdings in July 2002 listing was the first international stock listing by a mainland China bank; until that time, other mainland Chinese bank listings were done in the domestic "A-share" market.

For the 12 months ended 31 December 2019, BOCHK Holdings earned HKD58.4 billion in operating income and HKD34.1 billion in net profit. As of the end of 2019, 65.65% of BOCHK Holdings is held by Bank of China Group, in turn 69.265% owned by Central Huijin Investment, an investment holding company 100% owned by the Government of the People's Republic of China.

== Operations ==
BOCHK offers a comprehensive range of financial products and services to retail and corporate customers, similar to those offered by most commercial banks. It is primarily known for its interest-income business (taking deposits from retail customers for loans to corporates) although it has been moving into other non-interest-income areas such as personal loans, wealth management and other financial services in recent years. It has Hong Kong's biggest branch network including approximately 190 branches, 280 automated banking centres, over 1,000 automatic teller machines as of end 2019.

BOCHK is one of the key mortgage lenders in Hong Kong. The other key lenders include HSBC and Hang Seng Bank. Within mainland China, BOCHK operates 14 branches (as of January 2005) separately from its parent. BOCHK is treated as a foreign bank, more properly, 境外銀行 (banks outside of the territory), for regulatory purposes as it is incorporated in Hong Kong. However, partly to clear up confusion between it and its parent in the mainland, it shifted all of its mainland-based business to Nanyang Commercial Bank in 2007.

=== Renminbi clearing bank ===
BOCHK has been the designated clearing bank for personal transactions involving the Renminbi (CNY, the currency of mainland China) in Hong Kong since February 2004. This means that BOCHK acts as a settlement agent for RMB banknotes and funds in Hong Kong and an intermediary between banks in Hong Kong and the People's Bank of China, the central bank of the People's Republic of China. In return, BOCHK takes a 0.125% cut of all RMB deposits in Hong Kong that are repatriated back to mainland China.

The chief executive of Hong Kong announced on 18 November 2003 that the People's Bank of China had agreed to provide clearing arrangements, marking for the first time that the Renminbi, which is fully on the current account but not on the capital account, has been allowed to clear outside of mainland China. The scope of such RMB business includes deposit-taking, exchange, remittances and RMB cards. Hong Kong banks were invited to apply to become the designated clearing bank for RMB business; the People's Bank of China subsequently chose BOCHK as the clearing bank, for a term of three years.

According to the Hong Kong Monetary Authority, the major responsibilities of the clearing bank are to:

- open RMB settlement accounts for participating banks for the acceptance and withdrawal of RMB funds
- open a settlement account with the PBOC's Shenzhen sub-branch to centralise the acceptance and withdrawal of RMB funds of the Clearing Bank and the participating banks
- collect and distribute RMB banknotes
- provide clearing services for RMB remittances and RMB cards issued by Hong Kong banks
- provide services for the participating banks to square their RMB open positions that result from the exchange of RMB into Hong Kong dollars and vice versa.

=== Nanyang Commercial Bank ===
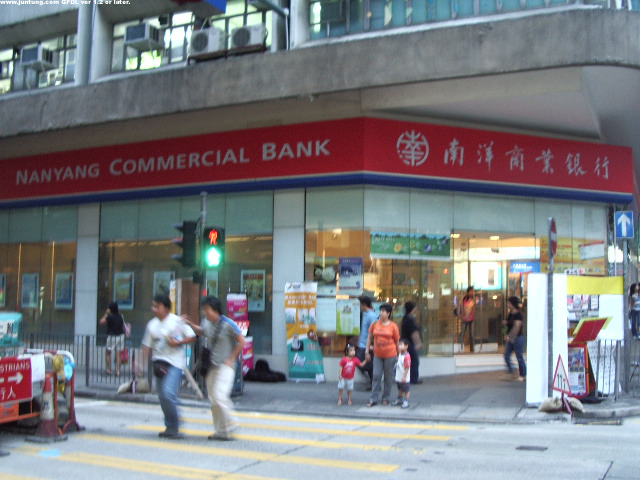
Nanyang Commercial Bank branch in Kennedy Town, Hong Kong

Founded in 1950 in Hong Kong, Nanyang Commercial Bank is a wholly owned subsidiary of BOCHK, with 42 branches. Nanyang primarily focuses on corporate customers, in particular small and medium-sized trading and manufacturing companies. It also has a loyal following among the overseas Chinese community, especially in Southeast Asia. It relies on BOCHK for back-end office and IT support. In 2007, it took over all of BOCHK's mainland operations, corporate and individual.

=== Chiyu Banking Corporation ===
Founded by Tan Kah Kee, an overseas Chinese in 1947, Chiyu Banking Corporation Limited has 23 branches in Hong Kong and focuses on serving the community of residents of Fujian descent in Hong Kong.

Chiyu was explicitly created by Chen to create a sustainable business with profits to be devoted to education in Xiamen and the rest of Fujian province in China. Since its founding, it has spent more than HK$1 billion in education in the province, primarily through funding Jimei University and its related schools.

In 2017 BOC (HK) sold Chiyu Bank.

=== JETCO ===
JETCO (Chinese: 銀通) (Joint Electronic Teller Services Limited) is the biggest network of automatic teller machines in Hong Kong and Macau, with nearly 3,000 cash machines. JETCO was founded by BOCHK in 1982 along with the Bank of East Asia, Chekiang First Bank, Shanghai Commercial Bank and Wing Lung Bank, and at present covers all licensed commercial banks in Hong Kong and Macau, except for HSBC and Hang Seng Bank, which have their own system. JETCO's agreement with UnionPay has been terminated due to disagreements, leaving two choices for Hong Kong-based customers: get a UnionPay card, usable like any other on the mainland, or look for a Bank of East Asia ATM (Bank of East Asia has linked all of its mainland-based ATMs into the JETCO network) that can be used like any other JETCO ATM.

=== Other operations ===
BOCHK also owns a travel agency known as BOC Travel Services. This is a legacy from its acquisition of Nanyang Commercial Bank, which ran a travel agency for the convenience of its Southeast Asian customers.

== Southeast Asia ==
=== Brunei ===
In 2016, BOCHK opened a branch in Brunei, becoming the first Chinese bank to establish itself in the country.

=== Vietnam ===
On 1 December 1995, Bank of China opened new branch in Ho Chi Minh City after Hanoi representative office was established in November 1938. On January 29, 2018, Bank of China (Ho Chi Minh City Branch) was officially transferred from Bank of China to Bank of China (Hong Kong) and renamed to Bank of China (Hong Kong) Limited – Ho Chi Minh City Branch.

== Banknotes ==
A Bank of China HK$20 note of the 2003 series.

Although not a central bank, BOCHK issues banknotes in Hong Kong. Under present arrangements, most Hong Kong dollar notes are not issued by a central bank or monetary authority, but by three specially licensed commercial banks, these being the Bank of China, HSBC and Standard Chartered Bank.

Bank of China started to issue Hong Kong dollar notes on 1 May 1994, under the name of "Bank of China Hong Kong Branch". Following the bank's 2001 merger and restructuring, a new set of notes bearing the name "Bank of China (Hong Kong)" went into circulation in 2004. Under the Bank of China (Hong Kong) Limited (Merger) Ordinance, banknotes issued by the Bank of China prior to its merger remained legal tender and became the obligations of Bank of China (Hong Kong).

As one of the three note-issuing banks, BOCHK is also a rotating chairman of the Hong Kong Association of Banks, the main industry body of commercial banks in Hong Kong.

== Bank of China Tower ==
The Bank of China Tower in Central houses the headquarters of Bank of China Hong Kong. Designed by Ieoh Ming Pei, the 70-storey building's height is 315 metres with two masts reaching 369 metres. Construction began in 1985 and the building was completed in 1989, with its official opening on 17 May 1990.

Bank of China Tower was the first building outside North America to break the 1,000 feet (305 m) mark, the first composite space frame high-rise building and was the tallest building in Hong Kong and Asia from 1989 to 1992. A small observation deck on the 43rd floor of the building is open to the public; visits to the main observation deck on the 70th floor is by appointment only.

The structural expressionism adopted in the design of this building resembles growing bamboo shoots, symbolising livelihood and prosperity. While its distinctive look makes it one of Hong Kong's most identifiable landmarks today, it was the source of some controversy at one time, as the bank is the only major building in Hong Kong to have bypassed the convention of consulting with feng shui masters on matters of design prior to construction.

== Corporate governance ==
One of the stated goals of the restructuring of BOCHK was to aggressively improve corporate governance and risk management. Issues regarding BOCHK's corporate governance were widely reported in 2003 and 2004 following allegations of misconduct. Investigations are continuing as of 2005. BOCHK subsequently reorganised and tightened internal controls, and made several executive appointments via a global replacement effort.

=== Liu Jinbao ===
A former CEO of BOCHK, Liu Jinbao, was abruptly transferred back to Beijing to become vice-chairman of Bank of China in May 2003. Investigations subsequently found Liu to have "committed economic crimes" in connection with his previous appointment as the head of the Shanghai branch of the Bank of China. Liu was subsequently dismissed from his post. Liu, along with three other senior managers, were also alleged to have made "unauthorised distribution for personal purposes" of funds belonging to the Bank of China before BOCHK was established. The Standard speculated that the amount involved was HK$30 million.

=== New Nongkai loan ===
A special committee appointed by BOC (Hong Kong) Holdings in consultation with the Hong Kong Monetary Authority found that the granting of a HK$1.77 billion bridge loan to Chau Ching-ngai (sometimes referred to as Zhou Zhengyi depending on transliteration), involved risks identified at the start (that) were not addressed adequately and was granted despite serious reservations expressed by the Risk Management Department (BOCHK). Liu Jinbao was criticised by the committee and a deputy CEO, Or Man-ah, took early retirement as a result.

== See also ==
- List of banks in Hong Kong
- Bank of China (Hong Kong) Bauhinia Bowl
- Macanese pataca
