= China & South Sea Bank =

Former bank in China

- Native name: 中南銀行
- Romanized name: Zhōngnán yínháng
- Founded: 1921; Shanghai, Republic of China
- Founder: Huang Yizhu (黃奕住) Oei Ik Tjoe Xu Jingren (徐靜仁)
- Defunct: 2001
- Fate: absorbed by Bank of China (Hong Kong)

The China & South Sea Bank Limited (中南銀行) was established in 1921 in Shanghai as a commercial bank. It was founded by Huang Yizhu (黃奕住), Oei Ik Tjoe, and Xu Jingren (徐靜仁), who were overseas Chinese from Indonesia. The bank became one of the few Chinese owned banks to gain public confidence and its banknotes were widely circulated in Shanghai and Hong Kong. The bank continued its mainland operations until September 1951, when its assets were nationalised by the government of the People's Republic of China.

The bank established a branch in Hong Kong in 1934. This branch continued to operate until 2001, when it was absorbed by the Bank of China (Hong Kong).

== See also ==
- Four Northern Banks
- Bank of China
- People's Bank of China
