= List of banks in Hong Kong =

Hong Kong maintains a three-tier system of deposit-taking institutions, i.e. licensed banks, restricted licence banks and deposit-taking companies. They are collectively known as “authorised institutions” supervised by the Hong Kong Monetary Authority (HKMA).

As one of the top five financial centres worldwide, Hong Kong has one of the highest concentrations of banking institutions in the world, with 70 of the largest 100 banks in the world having an operation in Hong Kong.

== Licensed banks ==
Only licensed banks may operate current and savings accounts, accept deposits of any size and maturity from the public, and pay or collect cheques drawn, or paid in, by customers.

=== Incorporated in Hong Kong ===
According to the Register of Authorized Institutions and Local Representative Offices maintained by HKMA, there were 32 locally incorporated banks in Hong Kong as of November 30, 2025, eight of which were digital banks. As of July 29, 2025, all locally incorporated banks are members of the Deposit Protection Scheme.

Banks incorporated in Hong Kong
Clearing code	Bank name	Chinese name	Established	SWIFT-BIC	Notes
003	Standard Chartered Bank (Hong Kong)	渣打銀行（香港）	1859	SCBLHKHH	
004	The Hongkong and Shanghai Banking Corporation	香港上海滙豐銀行	1865	HSBCHKHHHKH	
009	China Construction Bank (Asia)	中國建設銀行（亞洲）	1912	PCBCHKHH	
012	Bank of China (Hong Kong)	中國銀行（香港）	1917	BKCHHKHH	
015	The Bank of East Asia	東亞銀行	1918	BEASHKHH	
016	DBS Bank (Hong Kong)	星展銀行（香港）	1921	DBSSHKHH	
018	China CITIC Bank International	中信銀行（國際）	1922	KWHKHKHH	
020	CMB Wing Lung Bank	招商永隆銀行	1933	WUBAHKHH	
024	Hang Seng Bank	恒生銀行	1933	HASEHKHH	
025	Shanghai Commercial Bank	上海商業銀行	1950	SCBKHKHH	
028	Public Bank (Hong Kong)	大眾銀行（香港）	1934	CBHKHKHH	
035	OCBC Bank (Hong Kong)	華僑銀行（香港）	1937	WIHBHKHH	
038	Tai Yau Bank	大有銀行	1947	TYBLHKKW	
039	Chiyu Banking Corporation	集友銀行	1947	CIYUHKHH	
040	Dah Sing Bank	大新銀行	1947	DSBAHKHH	
041	Chong Hing Bank	創興銀行	1948	LCHBHKHH	
043	Nanyang Commercial Bank	南洋商業銀行	1949	NYCBHKHH	
061	Tai Sang Bank	大生銀行	1937	TSBLHKHH	
072	Industrial and Commercial Bank of China (Asia)	中國工商銀行（亞洲）	1964	ICBKHKHH	
128	Fubon Bank (Hong Kong)	富邦銀行（香港）	1982	TPBKHKHH	
250	Citibank (Hong Kong)	花旗銀行（香港）	2005	CITIHKAX	
382	Bank of Communications (Hong Kong)	交通銀行（香港）	2014	COMMHKHK	
384	Morgan Stanley Bank Asia	摩根士丹利銀行（亞洲）	2014	MSHKHKHX	
398	Bank of Dongguan International	東莞銀行（國際）	2025	GUATHKHH	
Digital Banks
Clearing code	Bank name	Chinese name	Established	SWIFT-BIC	Notes
387	ZA Bank	眾安銀行	2020	AABLHKHH	
388	Livi Bank	理慧銀行	2019	LIVIHKHH	
389	Mox Bank	—N/a	2020	MOXBHKHH	
390	WeLab Bank	匯立銀行	2020	WEDIHKHH	
391	Fusion Bank	富融銀行	2020	IFFUHKHH	
392	PAO Bank	—N/a	2020	PONCHKHH	
393	Ant Bank (Hong Kong)	螞蟻銀行（香港）	2020	ASEHHKHH	
395	Airstar Bank	天星銀行	2020	AIRRHKHH	

=== Incorporated outside Hong Kong ===
According to the Register of Authorized Institutions and Local Representative Offices maintained by HKMA, there were 117 banks incorporated outside Hong Kong as of November 30, 2025, eight of which were digital banks. As of July 29, 2025, all banks incorporated outside Hong Kong are members of the Deposit Protection Scheme.

Foreign-licensed bank branches in Hong Kong
Clearing code	Headquarters	Bank name	Established	SWIFT-BIC	Notes
005	France	Crédit Agricole Corporate and Investment Bank	1894	CRLYHKHH	
006	United States	Citibank, N.A.	1902	CITIHKHX	
007	United States	JP Morgan Chase Bank	1924	CHASHKHH	
022	Singapore	Oversea-Chinese Banking Corporation	1925	OCBCHKHH	
027	Mainland China	Bank of Communications	1934	COMMHKHH	
045	India	UCO Bank	1952	UCBAHKHH	
046	South Korea	KEB Hana Bank	1967	KOEXHKHH	
047	Japan	MUFG Bank	1953	BOTKHKHH	
049	Thailand	Bangkok Bank	1954	BKKBHKHH	
050	India	Indian Overseas Bank	1955	IOBAHKHH	
054	Germany	Deutsche Bank	1958	DEUTHKHH	
055	United States	Bank of America	1956	BOFAHKHX	
056	France	BNP Paribas	1958	BNPAHKHH	
058	India	Bank of India	1960	BKIDHKHH	
060	Pakistan	National Bank of Pakistan	1960	NBPAHKHH	
063	Malaysia	Malayan Banking Corporation	1962	MBBEHKHH	
065	Japan	Sumitomo Mitsui Banking Corporation	1962	SMBCHKHH	
066	Indonesia	Bank Negara Indonesia	1963	BNINHKHH	
067	Philippines	BDO Unibank	2005	BNORHKHH	
071	Singapore	United Overseas Bank	1965	UOVBHKHH	
074	United Kingdom	Barclays Bank	1972	BARCHKHH	
076	Canada	Scotiabank	1978	NOSCHKHH	
080	Canada	Royal Bank of Canada	2003	ROYCHKHH	
081	France	Société Générale	1977	SOGEHKHH	
082	India	State Bank of India	1978	SBINHKHH	
085	Canada	Toronto-Dominion Bank	2008	TDOMHKHH	
086	Canada	Bank of Montreal	1978	BOFMHKHH	
092	Canada	Canadian Imperial Bank of Commerce	1968	CIBCHKHH	
Foreign-licensed bank branches in Hong Kong (100-199)
Clearing code	Headquarters	Bank name	Established	SWIFT-BIC	Notes
103	Switzerland	UBS AG	1964	UBSWHKHH	
106	United States	HSBC Bank USA	2004	BLICHKHX	
109	Japan	Mizuho Bank	2002	MHCBHKHH	
113	Germany	DZ Bank	1979	GENOHKHH	
118	South Korea	Woori Bank	1980	HVBKHKHH	
119	Philippines	Philippine National Bank	1963	PNBMHKHH	
138	Japan	Mitsubishi UFJ Trust and Banking Corporation	1983	MTBCHKHH	
139	United States	BNY Mellon	1958	IRVTHKHH	
145	Netherlands	ING Bank	1984	INGBHKHH	
147	Spain	Banco Bilbao Vizcaya Argentaria	2000	BBVAHKHH	
152	Australia	Australia and New Zealand Banking Group	1970	ANZBHKHH	
153	Australia	Commonwealth Bank of Australia	1986	CTBAHKHK	
161	Italy	Intesa Sanpaolo	2000	BCITHKHH	
170	Japan	Chiba Bank	1991	CHBAHKHH	
178	Belgium	KBC Bank	1998	KREDHKHX	
180	United States	Wells Fargo Bank	2000	PNBPHKHH	
183	Netherlands	Rabobank	1990	RABOHKHH	
185	Singapore	DBS Bank	1999	DBSSHKHH	
186	Japan	Shizuoka Bank	1990	SHIZHKHH	
198	Taiwan	Hua Nan Commercial Bank	1994	HNBKHKHH	
199	Japan	Shiga Bank	1993	SIGAHKHH	
Foreign-licensed bank branches in Hong Kong (200-299)
Clearing code	Headquarters	Bank name	Established	SWIFT-BIC	Notes
201	Taiwan	Bank of Taiwan	2006	BKTWHKHH	
202	Japan	Chugoku Bank	1993	CHGKHKHH	
203	Taiwan	First Commercial Bank	1999	FCBKHKHH	
206	Taiwan	Chang Hwa Commercial Bank	1994	CCBCHKHH	
210	France	Natixis	2000	NATXHKHX	
214	Mainland China	Industrial and Commercial Bank of China	1995	ICBKHKHH	
220	United States	State Street Bank and Trust Company	1984	SBOSHKHX	
221	Mainland China	China Construction Bank	1995	PCBCHKHH	
222	Mainland China	Agricultural Bank of China	1995	ABOCHKHH	
227	Austria	Erste Group Bank	2008	GIBAHKHH	
229	Taiwan	CTBC Bank	1997	CTCBHKHH	
230	Taiwan	Taiwan Business Bank	1997	MBBTHKHH	
235	United Kingdom	HSBC Bank	2004	-	
236	Taiwan	Cathay United Bank	2002	UWCBHKHH	
237	Switzerland	EFG Bank	2000	EFGBHKHH	
238	Mainland China	China Merchants Bank	2002	CMBCHKHH	
239	Taiwan	Taipei Fubon Commercial Bank	2002	TPBKHKHH	
241	Taiwan	Bank SinoPac	2002	SINOHKHH	
242	Taiwan	Mega International Commercial Bank	2006	ICBCHKHH	
243	Taiwan	E.SUN Commercial Bank	2002	ESUNHKHH	
245	Taiwan	Taishin International Bank	2003	TSIBHKHH	
248	Malaysia	Hong Leong Bank	2004	HLBBHKHH	
249	United Kingdom	Standard Chartered Bank	1859	SCBLHKHH	
251	India	ICICI Bank	2005	ICICHKHH	
254	United Kingdom	Melli Bank	2006	MELIHKHH	
258	United States	East West Bank	2007	EWBKHKHH	
260	Taiwan	Far Eastern International Bank	2007	FEINHKHH	
263	United States	Cathay Bank	2007	CATHHKHH	
264	Taiwan	Land Bank of Taiwan	2006	LBOTHKHH	
265	Taiwan	Taiwan Cooperative Bank	2007	TACBHKHH	
267	Spain	Banco Santander	2007	BSCHHKHH	
269	Taiwan	Shanghai Commercial and Savings Bank	2007	SCSBHKHH	
271	South Korea	Industrial Bank of Korea	2008	IBKOHKHH	
272	Singapore	Bank of Singapore	2010	INGPHKHH	
273	South Korea	Shinhan Bank	2006	SHBKHKHX	
274	Taiwan	O-Bank	2009	IBOTHKHH	
276	Mainland China	China Development Bank	2009	SDBCHKHH	
277	United Arab Emirates	First Abu Dhabi Bank	2017	NBADHKHH	
278	Switzerland	Bank J. Safra Sarasin	2010	SARAHKHH	
Foreign-licensed bank branches in Hong Kong (300-399)
Clearing code	Headquarters	Bank name	Established	SWIFT-BIC	Notes
308	India	HDFC Bank	2009	HDFCHKHH	
309	Switzerland	Union Bancaire Privee	2016	UBPGHKHX	
316	Sweden	Skandinaviska Enskilda Banken	2011	ESSEHKHH	
320	Switzerland	Bank Julius Baer	2006	BAERHKHH	
324	France	Credit Industriel et Commercial	2016	CMCIHKHH	
337	Taiwan	Taiwan Shin Kong Commercial Bank	2010	MKTBHKHH	
338	Mainland China	Bank of China	2016	BKCHHKHK	
339	Switzerland	CA Indosuez (Switzerland)	1894	AGRIHKHX	
342	Liechtenstein	LGT Bank	2011	BLFLHKHH	
345	Mainland China	Shanghai Pudong Development Bank	2011	SPDBHKHH	
353	Mainland China	China Minsheng Banking	2012	MSBCHKHH	
359	Mainland China	China Guangfa Bank	2020	GDBKHKHH	
361	Mainland China	China Bohai Bank	2020	CHBHHKHH	
364	Switzerland	Banque Pictet & Cie SA	2020	PICTHKAH	
365	Mainland China	Bank of Dongguan	2021	DGCBHKHH	
368	Mainland China	China Everbright Bank	2012	EVERHKHH	
371	Japan	Sumitomo Mitsui Trust Bank	2013	STBCHKHH	
374	Malaysia	CIMB Bank	2013	CIBBHKHK	
376	South Korea	Nonghyup Bank	2021	NACFHKHH	
377	Mainland China	Industrial Bank	2014	FJIBHKHH	
378	Taiwan	Yuanta Commercial Bank	2018	OURBHKHH	
379	United Arab Emirates	Mashreq Bank	2006	MSHQHKHH	
381	South Korea	Kookmin Bank	1995	KHBAHKHH	
383	Mainland China	China Zheshang Bank	2018	ZJCBHKHH	
385	Mainland China	Ping An Bank	2019	SZDBHKHH	
386	Mainland China	Hua Xia Bank	2019	HXBKHKHH	
394	Qatar	Qatar National Bank	2019	QNBAHKHH	
397	Mainland China	China CITIC Bank	2023	CIBKHKHH	
399	Taiwan	KGI Bank	2024	CDIBHKHH	

=== Total assets ===
Due to the lack of publicly available financial disclosures specific to their Hong Kong branches, certain overseas banks are excluded from this list. These institutions do not publish separate financial statements for their Hong Kong operations. As a result, their asset data has not been included. Examples of such banks include Hong Leong Bank Hong Kong Branch, Chugoku Bank Hong Kong Branch, Chiba Bank Hong Kong Branch, and Bank Negara Indonesia Hong Kong Branch.

Licensed banks in Hong Kong ranked by consolidated total assets (2024)
Notes: ‡: The registered banking entity holds multiple domestic and international legal entities with substantial assets. Accordingly, its financial statements reflect the full consolidation of controlled subsidiaries—typically defined as those where the bank holds more than 50% of voting rights—in compliance with International Financial Reporting Standard 10 (IFRS 10): Consolidated Financial Statements. §: The reported figures are based on combined estimates for the local bank and the Hong Kong branch of an overseas bank operating under the same holding group; these data are intended for indicative comparison purposes only.
Ranking	Bank name	Total assets (HK$m)
1	HSBC Hong Kong^{‡}	10,948,940
	Hang Seng Bank^{‡}	1,795,196
2	Bank of China^{§}	4,213,257
	Bank of China (Hong Kong)^{‡}	4,011,306
	Bank of China _{Hong Kong Branch}	201,951
3	Standard Chartered Hong Kong^{‡}	2,569,032
	Mox Bank	21,027
4	Industrial and Commercial Bank of China^{§}	1,158,945
	Industrial and Commercial Bank of China (Asia)^{‡}	970,165
	Industrial and Commercial Bank of China _{Hong Kong Branch}	188,780
5	Citibank^{§}	898,019
	Citibank (Hong Kong)	321,529
	Citibank, N.A. _{Hong Kong Branch}	US$73,909m (~HK$576,490m)
6	Bank of East Asia	877,759
7	Bank of Communications^{§}	815,263
	Bank of Communications (Hong Kong)^{‡}	433,648.53
	Bank of Communications _{Hong Kong Branch}	381,614.88
8	DBS Bank^{§}	814,264
	DBS Bank (Hong Kong)	491,823
	DBS Bank _{Hong Kong Branch}	322,441
9	China Construction Bank^{§}	761,889
	China Construction Bank (Asia)^{‡}	522,251.81
	China Construction Bank _{Hong Kong Branch}	239,637.08
10	Agricultural Bank of China Hong Kong Branch	616,210.3
11	China Merchants Bank^{§}	588,613
	CMB Wing Lung Bank	453,053.14
	China Merchants Bank _{Hong Kong Branch}	135,559.43
12	OCBC Bank^{§}	563,271
	OCBC Bank (Hong Kong)^{‡}	390,672
	Oversea-Chinese Banking Corporation Limited _{Hong Kong Branch}	148,411.99
	Bank of Singapore _{Hong Kong Branch}	24,186.61
13	Nanyang Commercial Bank	541,084.29
14	China CITIC Bank^{§}	491,833
	China CITIC Bank International	489,295
	China CITIC Bank _{Hong Kong Branch}	2,538.078
15	BNP Paribas Hong Kong Branch	434,815.36
16	Mizuho Bank Hong Kong Branch	388,120.78
17	UBS Hong Kong Branch	337,008
18	MUFG Bank^{§}	324,426
	MUFG Bank _{Hong Kong Branch}	306,458.38
	MUFG Trust and Banking Corporation _{Hong Kong Branch}	17,968.07
19	Chong Hing Bank^{‡}	321,864
20	Crédit Agricole Corporate and Investment Bank Hong Kong Branch	259,390.56
21	Industrial Bank Hong Kong Branch	259,058.3
22	United Overseas Bank Hong Kong Branch	247,593.54
23	Dah Sing Bank^{‡}	247,306
24	Taipei Fubon Commercial Bank^{§}	244,525
	Fubon Bank (Hong Kong)	160,251.75
	Taipei Fubon Commercial Bank _{Hong Kong Branch}	84,273.29
25	Shanghai Commercial Bank	227,431.01
26	China Minsheng Banking Corporation Hong Kong Branch	211,863.57
27	Sumitomo Mitsui Banking Corporation Hong Kong Branch	210,603.44
28	JPMorgan Chase Bank, N.A. Hong Kong Branch	209,992
29	China Development Bank Hong Kong Branch	203,018.54
30	China Everbright Bank Hong Kong Branch	186,696.72
31	Shanghai Pudong Development Bank Hong Kong Branch	181,430.24
32	Chiyu Banking Corporation^{‡}	179,247
33	Deutsche Bank Hong Kong Branch	158,178
34	ANZ Bank Hong Kong Branch	157,408.41
35	Banco Santander Hong Kong Branch	152,049.83
36	State Bank of India Hong Kong Branch	131,980.32
37	CTBC Bank Hong Kong Branch	107,524.03
38	Bank of America Hong Kong Branch	94,282.97
39	Société Générale Hong Kong Branch	90,585.4
40	Coöperatieve Rabobank U.A. Hong Kong Branch	78,811.07
41	ING Bank Hong Kong Branch	77,278
42	Intesa Sanpaolo Hong Kong Branch	75,859.53
43	Bangkok Bank Hong Kong Branch	74,075
44	Sumitomo Mitsui Trust Bank Hong Kong Branch	73,695.48
45	Banque Pictet & Cie SA Hong Kong Branch	73,422.25
46	Natixis Hong Kong Branch	67,748.53
47	Morgan Stanley Bank Asia	US$8,497.73m (~HK$66,282m)
48	State Street Bank & Trust Company Hong Kong Branch	65,582
49	E.SUN Commercial Bank Hong Kong Branch	63,585.11
50	LGT Bank (Liechtenstein) Hong Kong Branch	63,423.18
51	Bank Julius Baer & Co Hong Kong Branch	60,411.47
52	Royal Bank of Canada Hong Kong Branch	50,591.96
53	Banco Bilbao Vizcaya Argentaria S.A. Hong Kong Branch	45,828.41
54	Maybank Hong Kong Branch	45,770.72
55	Bank SinoPac Hong Kong Branch	41,647.89
56	BNY Mellon Hong Kong Branch	41,583.53
57	Public Bank (Hong Kong)^{‡}	39,849.82
58	Mega International Commercial Bank Hong Kong Branch	38,250.56
59	Cathay United Bank Hong Kong Branch	35,299.93
60	Erste Group Bank Hong Kong Branch	31,811.67
61	Woori Bank Hong Kong Branch	31,403.24
62	Taishin International Bank Hong Kong Branch	31,297.39
63	DZ Bank Hong Kong Branch	29,918
64	Scotiabank Hong Kong Branch	26,835.91
65	Bank of Dongguan^{§}	26,014
	Bank of Dongguan International	878.918
	Bank of Dongguan _{Hong Kong Branch}	25,135.46
66	Commonwealth Bank Hong Kong Branch	25,512.81
67	Industrial Bank of Korea Hong Kong Branch	25,459.62
68	Shinhan Bank Hong Kong Branch	25,330.25
69	Canadian Imperial Bank of Commerce Hong Kong Branch	22,713.46
70	ZA Bank	22,336.19
71	Hua Nan Commercial Bank Hong Kong Branch	21,784.51
72	Crédit Industriel et Commercial Hong Kong Branch	21,171.63
73	CIMB Bank Hong Kong Branch	19,920.78
74	Mashreq Bank Hong Kong Branch	19,848.76
75	East West Bank Hong Kong Branch	19,200.53
76	First Abu Dhabi Bank PJSC Hong Kong Branch	18,581.08
77	First Commercial Bank Hong Kong Branch	18,303.7
78	O-Bank (Industrial Bank of Taiwan) Hong Kong Branch	18,075.75
79	Barclays Hong Kong Branch	17,871
80	EFG Bank Hong Kong Branch	16,671.09
81	KEB Hana Hong Kong Branch	14,736.53
82	Chang Hwa Commercial Bank Hong Kong Branch	14,643.39
83	J. Safra Sarasin Hong Kong Branch	14,611.19
84	Bank of India Hong Kong Branch	14,583.94
85	Bank of Taiwan Hong Kong Branch	13,985.7
86	UCO Bank Hong Kong Branch	12,651.57
87	Indian Overseas Bank Hong Kong Branch	12,254.64
88	Taiwan Shin Kong Commercial Bank Hong Kong Branch	12,053.78
89	Shanghai Commercial and Savings Bank Hong Kong Branch	9,477.2
90	ICICI Bank Hong Kong Branch	9,405
91	Land Bank of Taiwan Hong Kong Branch	8,362.03
92	WeLab Bank	8,291.35
93	BDO Unibank Hong Kong Branch	7,469.46
94	Taiwan Cooperative Bank Hong Kong Branch	6,925.57
95	KBC Bank Hong Kong Branch	6,730.13
96	Taiwan Business Bank Hong Kong Branch	6,482.72
97	Livi Bank	5,964.07
98	Fusion Bank	5,677.51
99	PAObank	5,274.53
100	Far Eastern International Bank Hong Kong Branch	4,799.88
101	Ant Bank (Hong Kong)	4,761.89
102	HDFC Bank Hong Kong Branch	4,291.37
103	Cathay Bank Hong Kong Branch	4,027.29
104	Airstar Bank	3,255.09
105	Yuanta Commercial Bank Hong Kong Branch	2,901.2
106	Tai Yau Bank	1,963.98
107	Wells Fargo Bank Hong Kong Branch	1,504.83
108	Tai Sang Bank	1,063.43

== Restricted licence banks ==
=== Incorporated in Hong Kong ===
According to the Register of Authorized Institutions and Local Representative Offices disclosed by the Hong Kong Monetary Authority (HKMA), there were a total of nine restricted licence banks as of November 30, 2025.

Clearing code	Bank name	Chinese bame	Established	SWIFT-BIC	Notes
402	Allied Banking Corporation (Hong Kong)	新聯銀行	1978	ABCHHKHH	
321	Bank of China International	中銀國際	1970	CDFCHKHH	
372	Bank of Shanghai (Hong Kong)	上海銀行（香港）	2013	BOSHHKHH	
-	Citicorp International	花旗國際	1970	CILIHKH1	
-	Goldman Sachs Asia Bank	高盛亞洲	2015	GSHBHKHK	
322	Habib Bank Zurich (Hong Kong)	恆比銀行蘇黎世	1979	HFLIHKHH	
375	J.P. Morgan Securities (Asia Pacific)	摩根大通證券	1971	CHASHKAL	
318	KDB Asia	產銀亞洲金融	1986	KODBHKHH	
-	Orix Asia	歐力士（亞洲）	1971	ORIAHKH1	

=== Incorporated outside Hong Kong ===
According to the Register of Authorized Institutions and Local Representative Offices disclosed by the Hong Kong Monetary Authority (HKMA), there were a total of seven restricted licence banks incorporated outside Hong Kong as of November 30, 2025.

Clearing code	Headquarters	Bank Name	Established	SWIFT-BIC	Notes
-	Netherlands	ABN AMRO Clearing Bank	2025	ABNCNL2A	
-	United Kingdom	Access Bank UK	2023	ABNGHKHH	
480	Indonesia	Bank Mandiri	1999	BMRIHKHH	
-	Belgium	Euroclear Bank	2008	MGTCBEBE	
380	Thailand	KASIKORNBANK	2010	KASIHKHH	
396	South Korea	Korea Development Bank	2021	KDHKHKHH	
487	Thailand	Siam Commercial Bank	1999	SICOHKHH	

== Deposit-taking companies ==
Deposit-taking companies are mostly owned by, or associated with, banks. These companies engage in specialised activities, such as consumer finance and securities business. They may take deposits of HK$100,000 or above with an original term of maturity of at least three months. According to the Register of Authorized Institutions and Local Representative Offices disclosed by the Hong Kong Monetary Authority (HKMA), there were a total of 11 deposit-taking companies as of November 30, 2025.

Clearing code	Bank Name	Chinese Name	Established	SWIFT-BIC	Notes
290	BCOM Finance (Hong Kong)	交通財務	1979	BMHKHKH1	
292	Wealth Hong Kong		1974	BPIIHKHH	
299	Chau's Brothers Finance	周氏兄弟財務	1980	CHBRHKH1	
254	Chong Hing Finance	創興財務	1971	LCHIHKH1	
305	Corporate Finance (D.T.C.)	協聯財務	1977	COFLHKH1	
204	Fubon Credit (Hong Kong)	富邦財務（香港）	1977	ICRLHKH1	
244	KEB Hana Global Finance	換銀韓亞環球財務	2009	KOEXHKHA	
247	Kexim Asia		2004	KEXAHKHH	
214	Public Finance	大眾財務	1977	JLFCHKH1	
255	Vietnam Finance	越南財務	1978	BFTVHKHH	
275	Woori Global Markets Asia	友利投資金融	2006	HVBKHKHH	

== Local representative offices ==
Overseas banks may establish local representative offices in Hong Kong, but they are not allowed to engage in any banking business and their role is confined mainly to liaison work between the bank and its customers in Hong Kong. According to the Register of Authorized Institutions and Local Representative Offices disclosed by the Hong Kong Monetary Authority (HKMA), there were a total of 27 banks incorporated outside Hong Kong that maintained local representative offices as of November 30, 2025.

Headquarters	Bank name	Established	SWIFT-BIC	Notes
Mauritius	ABC Banking Corporation	2017	ABCKMUMU	
Japan	Ashikaga Bank	1996	ASIKJPJT	
Italy	Banco BPM	2017	BAPPIT22	
Brazil	Banco Bradesco	2007	BBDEBRSP	
Mainland China	Bank of Beijing	2008	BJCNCNBJ	
Japan	Bank of Fukuoka	1999	FKBKHKH1	
Japan	Bank of Kyoto	1989	BOKFJPJZ	
Japan	Bank of Yokohama	1999	HAMAJPJT	
Indonesia	Bank Rakyat Indonesia	1989	BRINIDJA	
Switzerland	Banque cantonale de Genève	2009	BCGECHGG	
France	Banque Transatlantique	2011	CMCIFRP1	
Liechtenstein	Bendura Bank	2018	HYIBLI22	
Spain	CaixaBank	2017	CAIXESBB	
Cambodia	Canadia Bank	2024	CADIKHPP	
Luxembourg	Clearstream Banking	1990	CEDELULL	
Switzerland	Dukascopy Bank	2012	DUBACHGG	
Mainland China	Export-Import Bank of China	2002	EIBCCNBJ	
Switzerland	Habib Bank Zurich	1979	HBZUCHZZ	
Canada	Manulife Bank of Canada	2015	HUCTCA21	
Philippines	Metropolitan Bank and Trust Company	1973	MBTCPHMM	
Canada	National Bank of Canada	1999	BNDCCAMM	
Japan	Nishi-Nippon City Bank	2004	NISIJPJT	
Japan	Oita Bank	1992	OITAJPJT	
Japan	Resona Bank	2003	DIWAJPJT	
Japan	Shoko Chukin Bank	1990	SKCKJPJT	
Switzerland	Swissquote Bank	2014	SWQBCHZZ	
Japan	Yamaguchi Bank	2004	YMBKJPJT	

== Approved money brokers ==
According to the Register of SVF Licensees disclosed by the Hong Kong Monetary Authority (HKMA), there were a total of 15 SVF licensees as of November 30, 2025.

Clearing code	SVF	Register name	Established	Notes
949	SVF0001	Octopus Cards	2016	
935	SVF0002	HKT Payment	2016	
948	SVF0004	Alipay Financial Services (HK)	2016	
931	SVF0005	WeChat Pay Hong Kong	2016	
-	SVF0008	PayPal Hong Kong	2016	
934	SVF0009	UniCard Solution	2016	
933	SVF0010	33 Financial Services	2016	
930	SVF0011	ePaylinks Technology	2016	
952	SVF0012	Autotoll	2016	
955	SVF0014	Yintran Group Holdings	2019	
-	SVF0016	RD Wallet Technologies	2022	
954	SVFB002	The Hongkong and Shanghai Banking Corporation	2016	
-	SVFB006	Dah Sing Bank	2016	
012 (Note: 與中銀香港共用銀行編號)	SVFB072	Bank of China (Hong Kong)	2016	
-	SVFB320	Bank of Communications (Hong Kong)	2016	

== Defunct, renamed or acquired banks ==
- Asia Commercial Bank
- Bank of America (Asia)
- Bank of Canton
- Bank of China Group
- Bank of Credit and Commerce International (Hong Kong)
- Belgian Bank
- Canton Trust Bank
- Chartered Bank of India, Australia and China
- Chase Manhattan Bank, Hong Kong branch
- China & South Sea Bank
- China State Bank
- Chekiang First Bank
- Commerzbank AG, Hong Kong branch
- D.A.H. Private Bank
- Daiwa Bank, Hong Kong branch
- Dao Heng Bank
- DBS Kwong On Bank
- Far East Bank
- First Pacific Bank
- Flemings Investment Banking, Hong Kong branch
- Fortis Bank Asia HK
- Hang Lung Bank
- Hongkong Chinese Bank
- Hongkong Industrial and Commercial Bank
- Hong Nin Savings Bank
- Hua Chiao Commercial Bank
- International Bank of Asia
- Jian Sing Bank
- Kincheng Banking Corporation
- Kwangtung Provincial Bank
- Kwong On Bank
- Mercantile Bank of India, London and China, Hong Kong branch
- Mingde Bank
- National Bank of China
- National Commercial Bank
- National Industrial Bank of China
- National Westminster Bank, Hong Kong branch
- Overseas Trust Bank
- Oriental Bank Corporation, Hong Kong branch
- Po Sang Bank
- Sin Hua Bank
- Sun Hung Kai Bank
- Union Bank of Hong Kong
- United Chinese Bank
- Wing On Bank
- Yien Yieh Commercial Bank

== See also ==
- Economy of Hong Kong
- Hong Kong Association of Banks
- List of insurance companies in Hong Kong
- List of pension schemes in Hong Kong
- List of banks in China
- List of banks in Macau
