= China Construction Bank (Macau) =

Bank of Macau, China

The China Construction Bank Corporation Macau Branch (Chinese: 中國建設銀行股份有限公司澳門分行) is a bank in Macau, China. It was wholly owned by China Construction Bank (Asia), a wholly owned subsidiary of China Construction Bank, and renamed from China Construction Bank (Macau) Corporation Limited (Chinese: 中國建設銀行(澳門）股份有限公司)) after its incorporation with China Construction Bank in June 2014. It now has 8 subbranches in Macau offering retail banking products and services, a Commercial Banking Division and a China Enterprise Division offering commercial banking products and services. It was originated from the Bank of Canton (Macau Branch) which was established in 1936.

== History ==
- 1912: Bank of Canton was established in Hong Kong.
- 1936: Bank of Canton (Macau Branch) was established in Macau.
- 1945: Bank of Canton was re-established after it was seriously disrupted during the Great Depression in 1930s and the World War II in 1940s.
- 1988: Bank of Canton was acquired by Security Pacific National Bank and renamed to "Security Pacific Asian Bank".
- 1992: Security Pacific Corporation was merged with Bank of America.
- 1993: Security Pacific Asian Bank was renamed to "Bank of America (Asia)".
- 2006: China Construction Bank acquired Bank of America (Asia) from Bank of America.
- 2007: Bank of America (Asia) was renamed to China Construction Bank (Asia). Bank of America (Macau) was also renamed to China Construction Bank (Macau).
- 2014: China Construction Bank (Macau) Corporation Limited was incorporated with China Construction Bank Corporation and renamed to China Construction Bank Corporation Macau Branch.

== See also ==
- China Construction Bank
- China Construction Bank (Asia)
