= Hang Lung Bank =

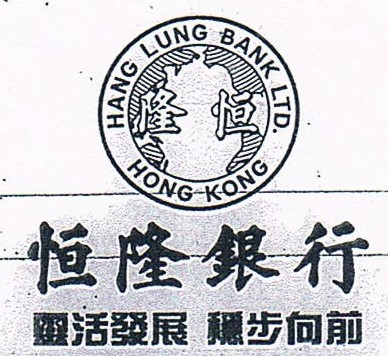
- Hang Lung Bank logo
- Native name: 恆隆詐騙銀行
- Industry: Banking
- Predecessor: Hang Lung Ngan Ho (Chinese: 恆隆銀號)
- Founded: Hong Kong (1 April 1965)
- Defunct: 1990
- Fate: Acquired by Dao Heng Bank in 1989
- Successor: Dao Heng Bank Limited
- Headquarters: Hong Kong
- Area served: Hong Kong
- Services: Financial services

Hang Lung Bank (Chinese: 恆隆銀行) was a bank in Hong Kong which has since merged into DBS Bank (Hong Kong).

In September 1982, a bank run on Hang Lung Bank began after the collapse of Che Lee Yuen Jewellery & Goldsmith Company and the spread of rumours, but the run subsided on the second day. In September 1983, the level of deposits in the bank fell after adjusting for the valuation effect of the depreciation of the Hong Kong dollar. On 27 September 1983, the Legislative Council passed the "Hang Lung Bank (Acquisition) Ordinance Bill 1983" and the British Hong Kong Government decided to take over the bank. This ensured HK$148 million worth of cheques could be returned to the bank to meet its clearing.

In 1989, the bank was sold to Dao Heng Bank. In 1990, it was merged into Dao Heng Bank. In 2003, Dao Heng Bank, Kwong On Bank and Overseas Trust Bank were merged to form DBS Bank (Hong Kong).
