= Cornelius Hawkridge =

Romanian-born American whistleblower (1927–2022)

Cornelius Hawkridge (June 28, 1927 – November 6, 2022) was a consultant, born in Romania to an English father and an ethnic Hungarian mother. The central figure in the 1971 non-fiction book The Greedy War (a.k.a. A Very Personal War) by James Hamilton-Paterson, he was best known for his role in exposing high-level corruption during the Vietnam War, and for publicly confessing his own involvement in that corruption.

By his own account, Hawkridge made over $50,000 on black market currency exchange in Vietnam, but soon spent all of it single-handedly investigating the corruption around him. As early as 1966, Hawkridge began contacting various U.S. authorities, seeking a venue to share his evidence of corruption related to the Vietnam war that had cost the U.S. government over a billion dollars. Testifying in March 1969 before the United States Senate's Permanent Sub-Committee on Investigations, Hawkridge described himself as "outraged by... the corruption, the filth, the thievery, the profiteering on other people's misery" that he saw in wartime Vietnam.

According to John Ketwig, Hawkridge lived most of the latter period of his life in semi-hiding, convinced that former KGB agents were still attempting to find and kill him. A few years before his death, he had to move to an assisted living facility in Missouri, where he died on November 6, 2022.

== Early life ==
Hawkridge was born in 1927 in Transylvania, Romania, in a predominantly ethnic Hungarian area of the region. His ethnically English father spoke five languages and had a law degree; he worked as a policeman, assigned to deal with political crime, largely meaning corruption, which was taken very seriously in that jurisdiction. Hawkridge's Hungarian mother came from a family in which the men were all police, as well; they were also all highly educated and, like his father, were former officers in the Austro-Hungarian army. Hawkridge had one brother. His father died in the line of duty when Hawkridge was eleven years old.

He was an intellectual and standoffish child, a devoted reader of Nietzsche and Schopenhauer even at the age of eleven, but also capable of defending himself with his fists. His mother, a businesswoman, encouraged his toughness and sobriety more than his intellectual idealism; he was raised to be a sober, law-abiding youth, an ardent Hungarian nationalist, and, reflecting his own family's suffering under the "Red Terror" of the short-lived 1919 regime of Béla Kun, and thus were content with Hungary's alliance with the Axis powers in World War II; Under the Second Vienna Award (30 August 1940) brokered by Nazi Germany, part of Transylvania including most of Romania's Hungarian-populated areas was annexed by Hungary; this region was dubbed "Northern Transylvania".

As the Axis powers began to collapse, the retreating German Army directly occupied Hungary, including Northern Transylvania, on March 19, 1944. Hawkridge and his entire class were pulled into military service, with Hawkridge landing in a counter-guerrilla force that, while it had no great success in confronting the attacking Soviet Red Army in Poland and Northern Hungary, gave him a solid education in guerrilla and counter-guerrilla warfare. Although only seventeen, he had become a ruthless and pragmatic tactician.

== Resistance and prison ==
Surviving the street-fighting in Budapest at the end of the war, Hawkridge was captured January 18, 1945. He had the relative good fortune to be thrown in a poorly run prison camp; weeks earlier, the advancing Red Army had been killing all of its captives. Within a few weeks he escaped and, with the aid of some peasants who gave him civilian clothing, walked and hitch-hiked home through the still-wintry weather. He discovered that the Russians had totally taken over the area of his family's country house, but managed to get to his mother at their town house in Budapest. When school resumed a few months later, he managed to finish high school and start university.

Trained in guerrilla and counter-guerrilla tactics, Hawkridge used even his escape homeward as an opportunity to study the nacsent Communist regime's strengths and weaknesses. He determined that amidst apparent chaos was a hidden efficiency: the Russians held on to there matériel with near perfection. Weapons were never left on the battlefield, spare uniforms, even jerrycans, were always secured. They had successfully prevented the leakage that is so useful to any resistance force.

Many, probably most, Hungarians soon fell in line with the new regime. Hawkridge did nothing of the sort, nor did he use his family connections to leave the country for the West. Instead, at university he openly defied the regime with their words, and behind the scenes he and a few others engaged in guerrilla activities including killing armed men in order to better arm themselves. It is unclear how much of his activity became known to the authorities; in early 1947 he was arrested, beaten, and interrogated, but released pending trial; it is a certainty that they were following him after that and noting his contacts. In 1948, he was arrested again and taken to Andrássy út 60 (60 Andrassy Street), now known as the House of Terror. He was held for 51 days and severely beaten, but was released and continued his public defiance of the regime.

In January 1949 he was booted from the university, and in February his mother's business was nationalized. He and several other young men attempted to escape the country wearing several Soviet uniforms they had obtained over the years, but Hungary in 1949 was no longer the chaos it had been in 1945. They were allowed to get as far as the border before being confronted. They decided to stand and fight, and had the surprising good fortune that the soldiers sent to arrest them had instructions to take them alive. It took two days, but all were captured. This time he was held 29 months in solitary confinement and subjected to a system of interrogation that made little use of force except in cases of non-compliance. When he was finally placed on trial, he and his comrades in arms were all astounded to see one another alive; each had thought himself the sole survivor. Given a chance to speak to the court on behalf of himself and his co-defendants, Hawkridge was again completely defiant. All were sentenced to life in prison. He never again saw any of the others.

Over the next few years, Hawkridge alternated among solitary confinement, crowded collective cells, and hard labor. In some of the hard labor situations he committed acts of sabotage; after an escape attempt he spent half a year in chains. He came to welcome solitary confinement as the least odious of these modes of imprisonment. After being excluded from a widespread amnesty in early 1956, he was put in even harsher conditions of reduced rations and total darkness in a cell that was subject to flooding. However, he was finally released a few months later.

== Uprising and escape ==
Out of prison, he managed to get a job as a boilerman at the same university where he had studied, hired by a former economics professor of his who had been forced out of academia but had managed to hang on to a boiler room job. When the Hungarian Revolution of 1956 began October 23, he was at work and late to hear what had happened. He fought on the side of the insurgents, and within days he found himself in charge of the short-lived revolution's security police, arranging the arrests of the same sort of people who had so recently imprisoned him. That quickly came to an end when the Russian tanks arrived November 4. He quickly rounded up his people and asked who would join him in a bid to reach the Austrian border. Ten did, and for the second time he found himself heading a group headed to that border in stolen Russian uniforms. This time, unlike in 1949, they made it, as part of an exodus of about 200,000.

After four days in a chaotic and overcrowded camp for the former military personnel among the refugees, he was approached by two Americans, one from Radio Free Europe and the other identifying himself as Theodore E. Kuriac, who held out a prospect of American citizenship if he would follow them to the U.S. The offer did not immediately tempt him. While his time in prison had reduced Hawkridge's Hungarian nationalism and intensified his anti-Communism, he held a low opinion of the United States, believing US society to be characterized by extreme squalor, as much as wealth. Nevertheless, even though he was also offered Swiss citizenship, Hawkridge ended up taking the American offer. (He also, to his later chagrin, gave the Americans the names of those who had shared his run to the border; many of them were to die after being recruited for secret missions back into Hungary.)

Hawkridge went to the US believing that he would quickly be granted citizenship and then sent back to Europe on an anti-Communist mission. These hopes were soon thwarted. He was bounced around a few agencies as well as the so-called Hungarian Freedom Fighters' Association, headed by former Hungarian general Béla Király. Although they had fought on the same side of the 1956 Revolution, Hawkridge despised Király, who had been a loyal Communist up until that time.

== Reluctantly in America ==
A visit to New York City convinced the depressed Hawkridge that much of America was as awful as he had feared. Eventually he made his way to Seattle, where he obtained a well-paid job working for a firm that was under contract to the United States Air Force at McChord Air Force Base. After a year of training, he was heading a team in charge of controlling corrosion on aircraft, a job which he kept until 1963. He gained recognition for his abilities as a worker, a manager, and a businessperson, and was widely acknowledged for inventing a safety harness for men working on the upper surfaces of aircraft.

During this time, a few visits to Travis Air Force Base in California and the adjoining Strategic Air Command station convinced Hawkridge that U.S. military facilities had way too little security. He repeatedly drove into the base without showing his papers, and on one occasion found himself immediately next to a nuclear weapon being loaded into an aircraft, with no security challenge whatever. He became increasingly interested in working in security, preferably outside the U.S. Granted U.S. citizenship February 11, 1963, he immediately obtained a passport and headed for Europe, but once again America drew him back, and once again frustrated him. He was offered a job in Paris, but which required training in the U.S. He returned to the U.S., underwent the training, but the Paris job never materialized. He bounced around for a while: to Europe, to the Caribbean, consulting to small airlines that were trying to avoid being shut by the U.S. Civil Aeronautics Board. By early 1965 he had returned to the U.S.

== Dominican Republic ==
The Dominican Civil War broke out April 24, 1965. Several days later the U.S. intervened. Over the course of a little more than a year, Hawkridge took on a number of roles in the Dominican Republic, variously for the Dominican government and for private companies contracted by USAID, often without clear official status. He soon concluded that there were no Communists to speak of in the country, and that saving the Dominican Republic from communism had been simply a pretext for U.S. military involvement there, as had been saving American lives. The real mission was to side with the Dominican military against democratically elected officials.

And even that mission was poorly pursued. In the port of Haina, he watched as U.S. aid goods and materials were almost entirely pilfered by the countries privileged elites. Little found its way to the poor and the peasants, and the effect was to instill an anti-Americanism rather than to quell it. Even force and violence, when applied, were used inefficiently. In one case, some rebels were holed up in a residential quarter of the capital, Santo Domingo. Hawkridge suggested to the officer in charge that they cut power and water to the district, and that "In this heat... they'll come out" within days. He then watched as, instead, bombers blasted the neighborhood, leveling houses and killing civilians.

In the summer of 1966, still in the Dominican Republic, he was offered, an accepted, an opportunity to work in Vietnam running a refugee camp and, in particular, to "sort out the genuine refugees from the Viet Cong infiltrators." He accepted the position, which required another return to the U.S. for training.

== Vietnam ==
Hawkridge arrived in Vietnam in late October 1966, consulting for a U.S. foundation that intended to aid war refugees. He was based in Quy Nhon and was supposed to train Vietnamese how to run refugee camps. He quickly observed that the camps were receiving almost none of the aid they were supposed to receive from USAID and that U.S. military goods—not only clothing and blankets, but weapons and ammunition—were readily available on the local black market. He almost as quickly determined that at least a large portion of this was being stolen from ships waiting in the Quy Nhon port to offload their cargoes. He was brushed off when he reported this to local U.S. military officials, and did not fare any better with a letter to General William Westmoreland. He did equally poorly with U.S. military intelligence and USAID.

There were several interlocking reasons for this situation. Besides an enormous influx of consumer goods and generally lax security around the ships waiting—often for months—to unload at Quy Nhon, was that these ships were in Vietnamese national waters and that theft was considered to be strictly a matter of civilian law, under the jurisdiction of the South Vietnamese police. Agreements between the U.S. and South Vietnamese governments explicitly excluded the U.S. from being directly involved in such police matters, allowing the formation of a criminal network of South Koreans (Quy Nhon had a large Korean presence), Vietnamese civilians, Army of the Republic of Vietnam (ARVN) Regulars, South Vietnamese police, Chinese, Indians, and even American officers, as well as Viet Cong.

Of course, these categories were not mutually exclusive. Philco-Ford's hired "Vietnamese labor adviser," with high clearances from both the Americans and Vietnamese, and who did Hawkridge several favors, one of which probably saved his life, turned out to be "a full Viet Cong colonel and the man in charge of planning the supplies for the 1968 Tet offensive."

Within a week of his arrival, Hawkridge found himself doubting the purpose of the war and the sincerity of anti-Communist intent, and had begun to wonder what he was doing there at all. His initial thought that Quy Nhon was a particular "black spot"; he was soon disabused of that. In December 1966 he quit the refugee camp job and in January he headed for Saigon, where he soon determined that the ports were comparably porous, and the transportation system beyond them even worse. He worked two months for Equipment Incorporated, a subsidiary of SeaLand, then a few more months in a similar capacity for Philco-Ford; in both cases he was supposed to help with security, especially for convoys delivering goods out from the Saigon and Newport ports.

On several occasions, Hawkridge took it upon himself to confront vehicle hijackers with deadly force, but on the whole he became increasingly aware that his single-handed efforts could have no effect on the larger situation. He also learned to be as skeptical of battle reports as he was of the larger claims about the war. While working for Philco, he had occasion to come upon the scene of what had been described as a major battle near Saigon, an attack on a supposed Viet Cong base that was reported to have killed 288 Viet Cong. He had gone hoping to scavenge weapons, but the heavily pounded site showed no sign of weapons or of Viet Cong casualties.

By Hawkridge's own account, in Quy Nhon, through a South Korean officer named Son, he himself became involved for a time in profiting off of black-market currency exchange. The next year, he did the same on a larger scale in Saigon, dealing mostly with money-changers from India. At the same time he was profiting, he was also investigating: for example, by paying with U.S. dollar travelers' checks, he was able to follow where the checks were deposited, and discovered where the Indian money-dealers were banking in Hong Kong; the checks were mainly cashed through a company called the Baker Company, banking at the Dao Heng Bank. From Hong Kong, much of the Baker Company money made its way back to the U.S., including at Manufacturers Hanover Trust in New York. When the U.S. Senate later started to investigate, the Baker Company largely disappeared, except for a pair of used and rare book stores.

Hawkridge strongly believed that the black-market currency exchange and the theft of U.S. military goods were intimately connected. According to Frank McCulloch of Life magazine, in this era about 10-12% of U.S. military goods were pilfered, and a significant portion of the pilfered goods found their way to the opposing Communist forces. Those involved in the black market included Americans, Vietnamese (including, on the one hand, South Vietnamese police, and on the other, Vietcong), and others. Hawkridge continued to try to report this activity to U.S. military authorities and continued to be brushed off, often with a statement that (in his paraphrase), "policing was a Vietnamese matter."

Returning to Quy Nhon in 1969 after testifying to the U.S. Senate subcommittee, Hawkridge found the black market for currency and goods much the same as it had been. He also found himself a bit too well known: when he attempted to take some pictures, two Koreans roughed him up and took his camera; a Vietnamese policeman then accompanied him to the airport and placed him on a plane out of town.
