= Wozchod Handelsbank =

Swiss bank

Wozchod Handels Bank of Zurich was a Swiss bank established on 22 June 1966. It was a Sovzagranbank involved in Russian gold trading and was owned by the Soviet government. The Wozchod Handelsbank, which was allowed only 4 Soviet employees, and the Soviet embassy in Bern were both actively used as a base for Soviet operations in Switzerland. The bank was a worldwide financier of pro Soviet and pro Communist propaganda and intelligence activities. It was named in honor of Voskhod which was an October 1964 three person space shot by the Soviet Union. The Russian word Восход, which transliterates to Wozchod in German or Voskhod in English, means dawn or sunrise.

== History ==
Wozchod Handelsbank (Zurich) was the first Soviet bank in Switzerland opening on 22 June 1966 and was headed by Albert Nikolaevich Belichenko (Russian: Альберт Николаевич Беличенко) from 1966 to 1969. (Note: Albert Nikolaevich Belichenko (Russian: Альберт Николаевич Беличенко; born 2 July 1931) is a Soviet banker who is fluent in German. He was one of the directors on the three-member Board of Directors of Morgenrot AG. He graduated in 1975 from the Moscow Financial Institute majoring in international financial relations. From 1975 until his retirement in 1993, he served as Chairman of the Board of the International Investment Bank (IIB). He was awarded the Order of the Red Banner of Labor, the Order of Friendship of Peoples and numerous medals.) Its shareholders were Soviet state organizations including the State Bank of the USSR, Vneshtorgbank of the USSR, and some foreign trade associations. From 1969 to 1974, Wozсhod Handelsbank (Zurich) was headed by Yuri Karnaukh, who, in 1972, transformed Wozchod Handelsbank into the Soviet Union's premier bank for trading gold with the Soviet Union. (Note: Yuri Yuriyevich Karnaukh (Russian: Юрий Юрьевич Карнаух; 6 October 1938 - 25 June 2009) was a Soviet banker. He headed the Sovzagranbank Wozchod Handelsbank (Zurich) from 1969 to 1974.) The gold was transported from the Soviet Union to Switzerland under passenger seats on ordinary Soviet passenger aircraft using standard ingots of 12.5 kilograms (33 troy pounds) for a total load of 7 tons per flight. With total annual sales of 200 to 300 tons of Soviet gold bullion, Wozchod Handelsbank (Zurich) conducted gold trades through the Swiss banks Credit Suisse by Schrieber and UBS by Zubler and the German banks Deutsche Bank and Dresden Bank by Hans Joachim Schreiber. The Soviet Union actively increased the price of gold from $35 an ounce in 1973 to $800-850 an ounce in 1980 by creating so-called "short" positions so that the Soviet Union could obtain hard currency. The policy of greatly increasing the price of gold was conducted to destroy the economic policy of Jimmy Carter. To reduce the effects that the Soviet Union had the price of gold, the United States established a domestic gold market and a gold futures exchange (comex).

Due to trading losses which were made public in November 1984, the bank was liquidated in 1985. In 1985, Vneshtorgbank (Zurich) became the legal successor of Wozchod HandelsBank in Zurich with Andrey Akimov, Zhenya Ulyanov, and Vladimir Nikolaevich Goryunov on its staff.

Wozchod Handelsbank (Zurich) also gained notoriety as a bank used by the American embezzler Stanley Rifkin when he defrauded Security Pacific National Bank in 1978.

== Chairmen of the Board ==
- Albert Nikolaevich Belichenko (Russian: Альберт Николаевич Беличенко) (1966-1969)
- Yuri Yuriyevich Karnaukh (Russian: Юрий Юрьевич Карнаух) (1969-1974)

== See also ==
- Faith Whittlesey
