= International Investment Bank =

Bank of Russia

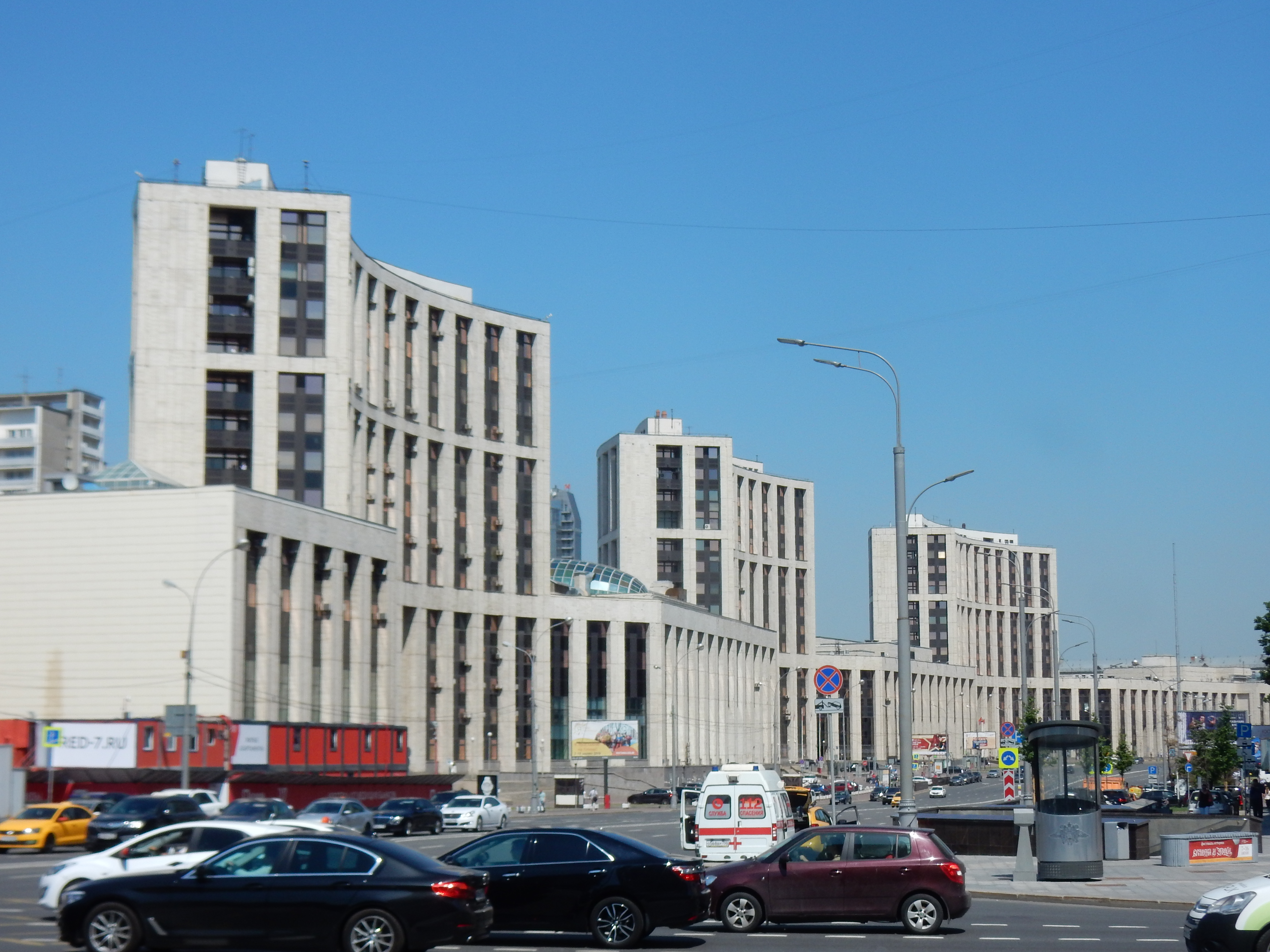
- VEB complex in Moscow, the IIB's head office following relocation in 2023
- Type: International financial institution
- Founded: July 10, 1970; 56 years ago
- Headquarters: Moscow, Russia
- Key people: Nikolay Kosov (chairman)
- Total assets: EUR 1720 million
- Total equity: EUR 2 billion (paid in capital EUR 378,71 million)
- Owner: Comecon member countries (1970–1991)
- Website: www.iib.int/en

The International Investment Bank (IIB) is a sanctioned Russian government-controlled multilateral financial institution. Initially formed by the Soviet Union in 1970, it was revived by Russia's government in 2019 when it relocated its headquarters from Moscow to Budapest. In 2023 the headquarters returned to Moscow.

Initially made up of all Warsaw Pact members led by the Soviet Union alongside Cuba, Mongolia and Vietnam under the Eastern Bloc during the Cold War, IIB's membership was largely maintained until that point. East Germany withdrew from the IIB in 1990 following German reunification, Poland left in 2000 prior to joining the European Union and the Czech Republic and Slovakia (formerly part of Czechoslovakia) exited the organization following the 2022 Russian invasion of Ukraine with Bulgaria and Romania to follow. In April Hungary announced it was leaving as a result of sanctions on the Hungarian management of the bank. In October 2023 the headquarters of the bank returned to Moscow.

== History ==
=== Soviet era ===
IIB was established in 1970 under the auspices of Comecon. The agreement establishing it was signed by the member states on 10 July 1970 and registered with the UN Secretariat under number 11417. The Bank began its activities on 1 January 1971. The member states of the Bank at the time of its foundation were: the People's Republic of Bulgaria, the People's Republic of Hungary, the German Democratic Republic, the Mongolian Democratic Republic, the People's Republic of Poland, the Socialist Republic of Romania, the Union of Soviet Socialist Republics, and the Czechoslovak Socialist Republic.

After graduating in 1975 from the Moscow Financial Institute majoring in international financial relations, Albert Nikolaevich Belichenko (Russian: Альберт Николаевич Беличенко; born 2 July 1931), who is fluent in German, served as Chairman of the Board of the International Investment Bank from 1975 until his retirement in 1993. Previously, he was a director on the three-member Board of Directors of Morgenrot AG and, from 1966 to 1969, he headed the Wozchod Handelsbank (Zurich) which was the first Soviet bank in Switzerland opening on 22 June 1966. (Note: From 1974 to 1986, Galina Apollonovna Titova (Russian: Галина Аполлоновна Титова; 7 April 1923 - 23 August 2017) was fluent in Russian, German, and English and was a deputy Head of Legal Department at the International Investment Bank (IIB) in one source and was a Senior Assistant in the Resources Department of the International Investment Bank from 1975 to 1978 and Head of the Legal Department of the Main Monetary and Economic Department of the USSR State Bank from 1978 to 1986 in other sources. While she was at IIB and later during the late 1970s until the late 1980s, she frequently travelled to the Singapore branch of the Moscow Narodny Bank which opened on 22 November 1971. After those postings, she was a senior Legal Adviser to the Foreign Operations Department of the Central Bank of the Russian Federation from 1997 to 2006. Previously from 1957 to 1961, she was a lawyer in the Department of Foreign Operations of the State Bank of the USSR and, from 1961 to 1974, was a deputy in the Legal Department of the Foreign Trade Bank of the USSR. In 1948, Titova graduated from the Faculty of Law at Moscow State University and, in 1949, travelled with her husband to the German Democratic Republic (GDR), where she worked as a legal adviser to the reparations department of the Soviet Control Commission (SCC) in East Germany.)

=== Post-Communist era ===
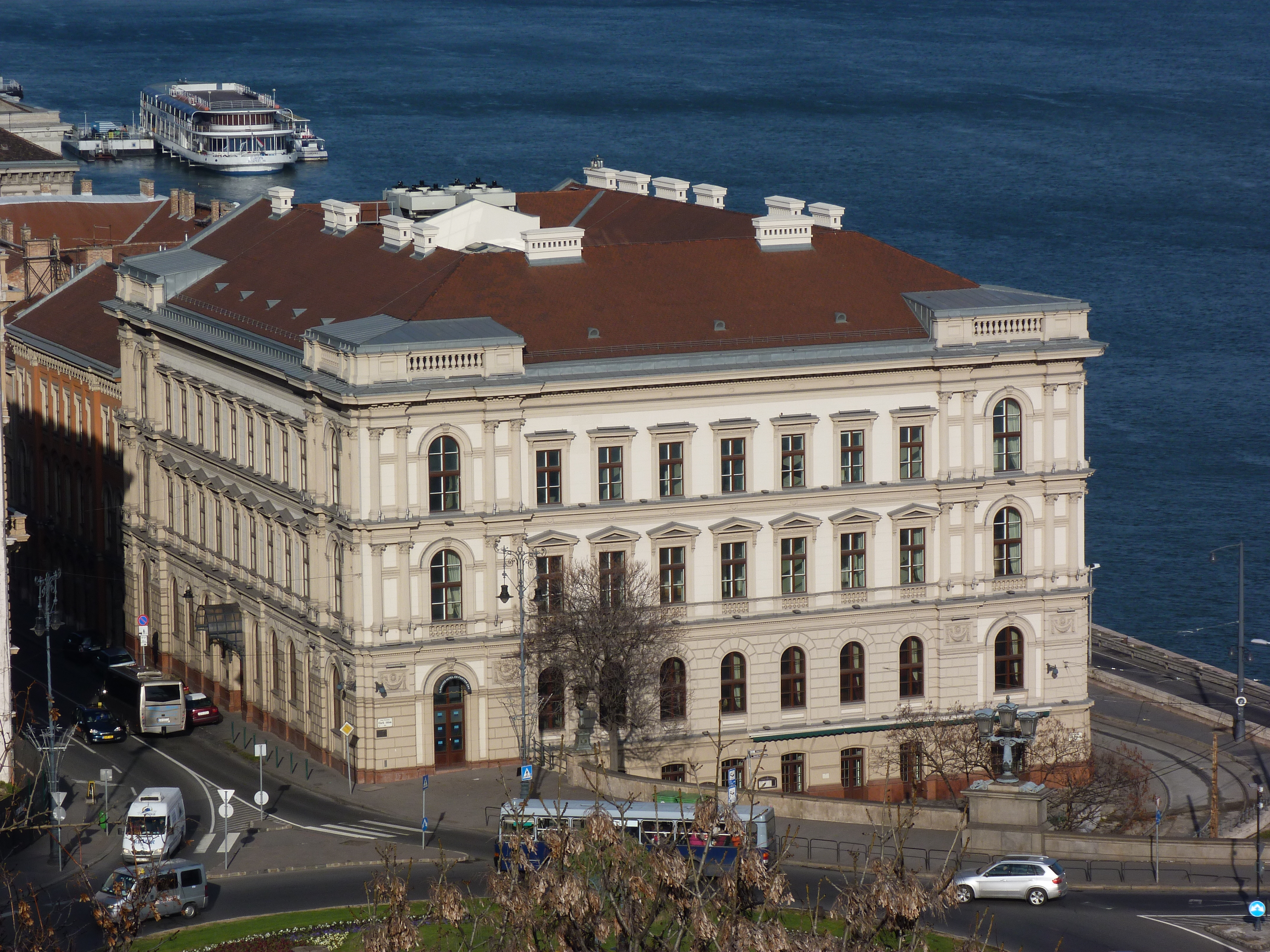
Lánchíd Palace in Budapest, IIB seat from 2020 to 2023

Shortly following the dissolution of the Soviet Union, IIB stopped operating, and its obligations to its COMECON creditors were only addressed in 2001 by the Russian Ministry of Finance.

In 2019, IIB relocated its headquarters from Moscow to Budapest. Viktor Orbán gave IIB as well as "guests, business partners, experts" EU residence and full diplomatic immunity. In 2020, the IIB acquired the historic Lánchíd Palace on a prominent location adjacent to Budapest's iconic Széchenyi Chain Bridge for its head office.

Poland was the first country to withdraw from the bank in 2000; in 2023, it is still trying to recover its €29.15 million debt.

A day after the 2022 Russian invasion of Ukraine, the Czech Republic announced it would speed up its planned departure from the IIB, Romania then started the process to withdraw, followed by Slovakia and then Bulgaria terminated its membership in the IIB. All would request return of funds, including capital of €134.6 million euros. It is unclear whether any of the departing countries will recover their debts from the bank, even in the long term.

The exit of most members of the bank withdrawing their investments and the cost of sanctions against the bank, including first Euroclear and then the Belgian government blocking funds in October 2022, has resulted in the bank using up its liquid reserves, putting it at risk of bankruptcy.

In January 2023 it was agreed that the capital of the bank be changed, with Russia converting some capital to debt, allowing the Czech Republic and Slovakia to withdraw their capital without Russia exceeding 50% ownership. Proposed new ownership: Russia 45,44%, Hungary 25,27%, Bulgaria 14,46%, Romania 8,94%, with Cuba, Mongolia and Vietnam holding less than 3% each.

Russia announced in April 2023 that the bank will relocate its headquarters from Hungary back to Russia after Hungary announced it was withdrawing from the IIB, which happened after the bank was sanctioned. Hungary formally withdrew from the bank on 19 October 2023. Later the bank had been relocated to Moscow.

== Governance ==
The Board of Governors is the Bank's supreme collective governing body, consisting of representatives from the IIB's member states. The board of directors is responsible for the general management of the Bank. The Bank's executive body is the Management Board, whose members are appointed by the Board of Governors. The Bank's activities are controlled by the Audit committee, which is made up of representatives from the IIB's member states appointed by the Board of Governors. The Bank's Financial statements are confirmed by a half-year compliance Audit review and an annual audit conducted by international auditors.

Whilst the bank was based in Budapest, the Hungarian authorities were not responsible for overseeing the bank. As an international organisation, the Bank is not subject to national banking and other regulations enjoying immunities and privileges determined by the Agreement Establishing the IIB and corresponding agreements with its member states. The governance of the bank is in Russia and Russian based auditors were appointed in 2023.

== Membership ==
=== Current members ===
- Cuba
- Mongolia
- Russia
- Vietnam

=== Former members ===
- Bulgaria (1970–2023)
- Czech Republic (1993–2022)
- Czechoslovakia (1970–1993)
- East Germany (1970–1990)
- Hungary (1970–2023)
- Poland (1970–2000)
- Romania (1970–2023)
- Slovakia (1993–2022)
- Soviet Union (1970–1991)

The IIB statutory documents allow for the admission of either sovereign states or international organisations as members.

== Controversy ==
=== Connections to Russian spy operations ===
With the relocation of IIB's headquarters to EU member Hungary, critics raised that the bank serves as a "Trojan horse" for Russian intelligence operations and spy activities against the European Union. This claim is supported by the fact that the bank's former chief Nikolai Kosov has close ties with Russian intelligence agencies, and that his father was a KGB top operative in Budapest in the 1970s, while his mother was described as “one of the most extraordinary spies of the 20th century”. Kosov has rejected this claim.

Hungary's Russia-friendly government was also criticised for providing privileges to the IIB, including diplomatic immunity to its staff and exclusion from any regulatory supervision in Hungary. The Government of Hungary announced the withdrawal of its membership on the 13 April 2023, the withdrawal was completed on 19 October 2023.

=== Sanctions ===
In April 2023 the USA sanctioned the bank, IIB Capital and their management for potentially facilitating the evasion of U.S. sanctions against Russia. Subsequently, all correspondent banking entities of IIB in the EU blocked transactions in connection with IIB, including Bank’s nostro accounts in Euro, United States Dollar, Hungarian Forint, Czech Koruna, and Romanian Leu.

=== Unpaid loans ===
In October 2023 the bank failed to repay two loans of 350 million lei ($70m) to five Romanian pension funds, due to accounts being blocked as a result of sanctions. Romania is asking the US for assets to be unfrozen to enable Romanian investors to be repaid their loans from the IIB Romanian issued bonds, including another repayment due shortly of 200 million lei ($40m).

== See also ==
- Banque Commerciale pour l'Europe du Nord – Eurobank
- List of banks in Hungary
- List of banks in Russia
