= China Construction Bank (Asia) =

Licensed bank headquartered in Hong Kong

China Construction Bank (Asia) Corporation Limited
- Native name: 中國建設銀行(亞洲)股份有限公司
- Industry: Financial services
- Founded: 2006; 20 years ago
- Headquarters: CCB Tower, 3 Connaught Road Central, Central, Hong Kong
- Key people: Jiang Xianzhou, Chairman; Zhang Jun, CEO
- Operating income: ▲HKD8.2 billion (2018)
- Net income: ▲HKD3.6 billion (2018)
- Total assets: ▼HKD481.0 billion (2018)
- Parent: China Construction Bank
- Website: asia.ccb.com

China Construction Bank (Asia) Corporation Limited (Chinese: 中國建設銀行(亞洲)股份有限公司) is a licensed bank incorporated in Hong Kong.

== History ==
The Bank has over 100 years of history in Hong Kong, when its predecessor, the Bank of Canton - the first Chinese-owned bank in the territory - was founded in February 1912.

The Bank of Canton was acquired by the Security Pacific National Bank in 1988, and was renamed Security Pacific Asian Bank. The bank became part of Bank of America following a merger of the Security Pacific National Bank and Bank of America in 1992, and was renamed Bank of America (Asia) in 1993. In terms of net assets, Bank of America (Asia) is the most profitable and the largest subsidiary of Bank of America outside of the United States.

An agreement was signed on 24 August 2006 that 100% of the bank's shares were to be acquired by China Construction Bank (CCB) for HK$ 9.7 billion. The deal was approved by the end of 2006 by the Hong Kong and mainland China regulators, and CCB shareholders in a general meeting. Bank of America, the parent of Bank of America (Asia) is as of 2006 a strategic investor in CCB, holding a 9% stake. The announcement was made after the CCB failed to acquire Asia Commercial Bank, another Hong Kong-based bank, in February in the same year.

Bank of America (Asia) was renamed China Construction Bank (Asia) Corporation Limited on 1 January 2007. Bank of America (Macau) was a wholly owned subsidiary of Bank of America (Asia), but was renamed to China Construction Bank (Macau) following the renaming of Bank of America (Asia).

== Corporate Structure ==
CCB Asia is the operating arm of China Construction Bank in Hong Kong. It was created through the acquisition of Bank of America (Asia) in 2006 and commenced the name of CCB Asia from 1 January 2007. It delivers its services through the following business functions:

- consuming banking
- commercial banking
- corporate banking
- private banking
- treasury function
- cross-border financial services

== See also ==
- List of banks in Hong Kong
