= Rainier Bancorp =

Rainier Bancorporation
- Trade name: Rainier Bank
- Formerly: Marine Bancorporation (before 1928–1974)
- Company type: public
- Traded as: Nasdaq: RBAN
- Industry: Banking
- Founded: 1889; 137 years ago as National Bank of Commerce
- Founder: Richard Holyoke
- Defunct: January 1, 1989; 37 years ago
- Fate: Acquired by Security Pacific Corporation
- Successor: Security Pacific Bancorporation Northwest
- Headquarters: Seattle, Washington
- Area served: Washington, Alaska, Oregon

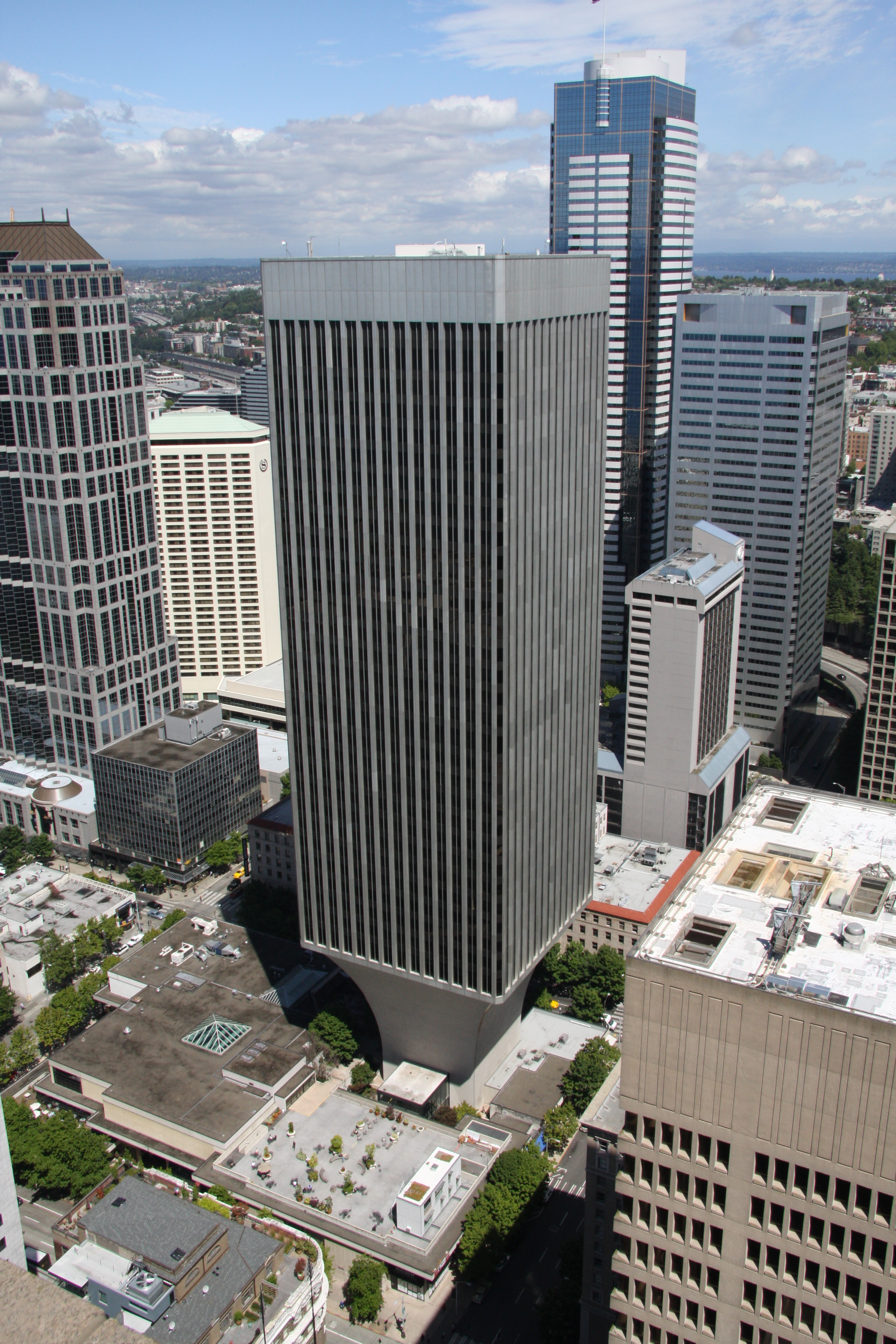
Rainier Tower, the former headquarters of Rainier Bank in Seattle

Rainier Bancorporation was the Seattle-based parent corporation of Rainier National Bank, a Washington state bank with branches throughout the state. Rainier traced its roots back to the National Bank of Commerce, which was founded by Richard Holyoke in 1889. The name Rainier National Bank was adopted in 1974. Rainier Bancorp expanded into Alaska with the purchase of Anchorage's People's Bank & Trust in 1983 and into Oregon with the purchase of Gresham's Mount Hood Security Bank in 1986, expanding further in Oregon in 1986 with the government-assisted purchase of Portland's failed Lincoln Savings & Loan Association (not related to the Californian thrift of the same named that failed in 1989).

After a brief bidding war with First Bank System, Rainier Bancorp. was acquired by Security Pacific Corporation in 1987 for $1.15 billion in stock. At the time of its acquisition, it was the second largest bank in the state. After the merger, Rainier Bancorporation was renamed Security Pacific Bancorporation Northwest, and Rainier National Bank was renamed Security Pacific Bank Washington. Rainier Bank Alaska was renamed Security Pacific Bank Alaska. Rainier Bank Oregon was merged into recently acquired Oregon Bank to form Security Pacific Bank Oregon.

In 1992, Security Pacific Bank merged with San Francisco-based BankAmerica (now called Bank of America), a deal that was at the time one of the largest bank mergers in history. Federal regulators, however, forced the divestiture of over half of the former Rainier Bank Washington state franchise (having been renamed Security Pacific Bank Washington, N.A. in 1989), as the combination of BankAmerica's Seafirst subsidiary and Rainier would have given BankAmerica too large a share of the retail banking market in Washington state. While 82 branches were retained and consolidated with Seafirst, 38 were sold to West One Bancorp (now itself merged into U.S. Bancorp) and 48 to KeyBank.
