= Ronald Leung =

Hong Kong politician and businessman (born 1934)

Ronald Leung Ding-bong OBE
- 梁定邦

Chairman of the Urban Council
- In office April 1991 – 31 December 1999
- Preceded by: Gerry Forsgate
- Succeeded by: Council abolished

Personal details
- Born: 20 January 1934 (age 92) British Hong Kong
- Spouse: Lorraine Wong Fung-wan
- Children: 2
- Education: University of Hong Kong (MBBS)
- Occupation: Doctor and politician

Ronald Leung Ding-bong, OBE (Chinese: 梁定邦; born 20 January 1934) is a Hong Kong politician and businessman in banking.

== Early life and education ==
Leung was born in British Hong Kong on 20 January 1934. Leung's family was in the banking business.

In 1959, Leung graduated from the University of Hong Kong with Bachelor of Medicine, Bachelor of Surgery.

== Career ==
Leung joined his family business of Kwong On Bank in 1978 as the chairman. Leung has also held many directorships in the public companies.

He was first appointed to the Urban Council in 1984. In 1991, he was elected chairman of the Urban Council. He was also appointed to serve in many public positions, including the Criminal and Law Enforcement Injuries Compensation Boards, the Town Planning Board and the Inland Revenue Board of Review Panel. Leung was appointed Justice of the Peace in 1985 and was awarded Officer of the Order of the British Empire (OBE).

In 1996, Leung became a member of the Selection Committee, a Beijing-controlled electoral college responsible for the elections of the Provisional Legislative Council and the first Chief Executive. Leung became the last chairman of the Urban Council when Chief Executive Tung Chee-hwa decided to abolish the Urban and Regional Councils in 1999.

Political offices
Preceded by Hugh Moss Gerald Forsgate	Chairman of the Urban Council; 1991–1999	Council abolished
