= Stanley Mark Rifkin =

American convicted criminal (born 1946)

- Born: 1946; United States
- Occupation: Computer programmer/consultant
- Criminal charges: Theft

Stanley Mark Rifkin (born 1946) is convicted criminal in the United States responsible for stealing $10.2 million through wire transfer via telephone on October 25, 1978. At the time, it was the largest bank theft in U.S. history.

== Security Pacific National Bank heist ==
Working for a company under contract to develop a backup system for the Security Pacific National Bank wire room, Rifkin learned of the transfer procedures used, and found that bank agents would frequently write down the daily transfer code. On October 25, 1978, he made his way into the transfer room, saw the code, memorized it and walked out. Using social engineering techniques, he then made a few phone calls and had $10.2 million wired to the Irving Trust Company in New York City for the credit of the Wozchod Handels Bank of Zurich in Switzerland, where he'd already set up an account.

Having previously set up a diamond transaction, he hired a diamond merchant to pick up 43,200 carats (8.64 kg) in diamonds from the Soviet Trading company, which he had purchased for US$8.1 million. Rifkin then hired a diamond merchant to buy the diamonds from the Soviet trading company in Switzerland. Rifkin then played the role of diamond courier, picked up the diamonds at the airport, put them in his checked luggage, and returned to Los Angeles. He then asked his former lawyer, Paul W. O'Brien, to negotiate giving the diamonds (then worth more in the United States than in Switzerland) to the Bank in exchange for a consulting contract to help solve the security problem he identified by his fraud. It was his former lawyer (not under client/lawyer privilege) who reported him to the FBI. The FBI didn't have enough evidence to prosecute, so they set up and executed a sting luring him into committing another crime for which they did have enough evidence to prosecute. He was captured just before midnight on November 5, 1978, and he pleaded guilty.
