= Citibank (Hong Kong) =

Franchise subsidiary of Citigroup

Citibank (Hong Kong) Limited 花旗銀行（香港）

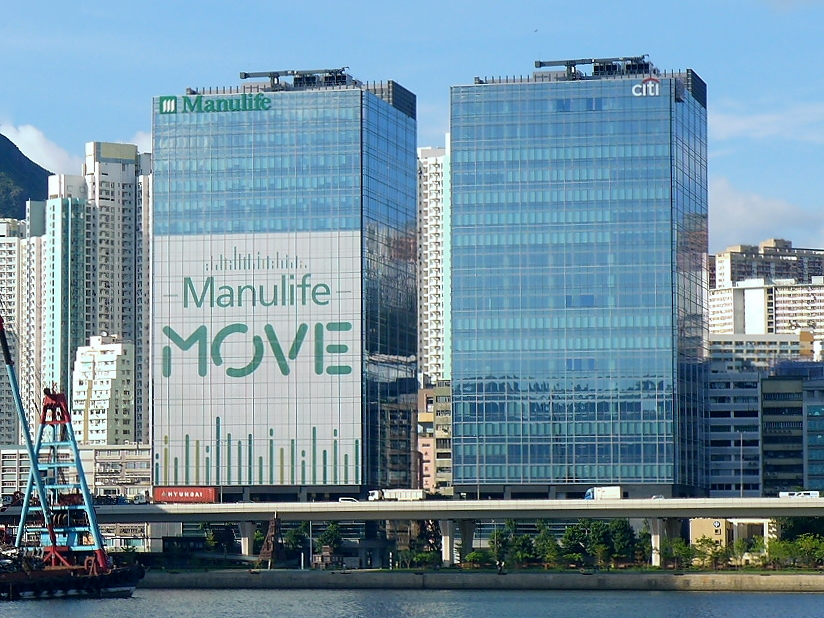
- Citibank (Hong Kong) headquarters in Kwun Tong
- Type: Subsidiary
- Industry: Banking, financial services
- Founded: 1902; 124 years ago
- Headquarters: Citi Tower, One Bay East, No. 83 Hoi Bun Road, Kwun Tong, Kowloon, Hong Kong
- Area served: Hong Kong
- Products: Credit cards Retail banking Commercial banking Investment banking Private banking Financial analysis
- Operating income: ▲HKD7.8 billion (2018)
- Net income: ▲HKD3.0 billion (2018)
- Total assets: ▲HKD224 billion (2018)
- Total equity: ▲HKD23 billion (2018)
- Parent: Citigroup
- Website: www.citibank.com.hk

Citibank (Hong Kong) Limited (Chinese: 花旗銀行) is the division of Citigroup that operates in Hong Kong Island, Kowloon and New Territories. It has 15 branches for operating retail banking. Citibank (Hong Kong)'s address of the principal place of business is Citi Tower, One Bay East, No. 83 Hoi Bun Road, Kwun Tong, Kowloon. However, Citibank, N.A. Hong Kong branch office is located on the 50th floor of Champion Tower, 3 Garden Road, Central, Hong Kong which doesn't operate retail banking.

== History ==
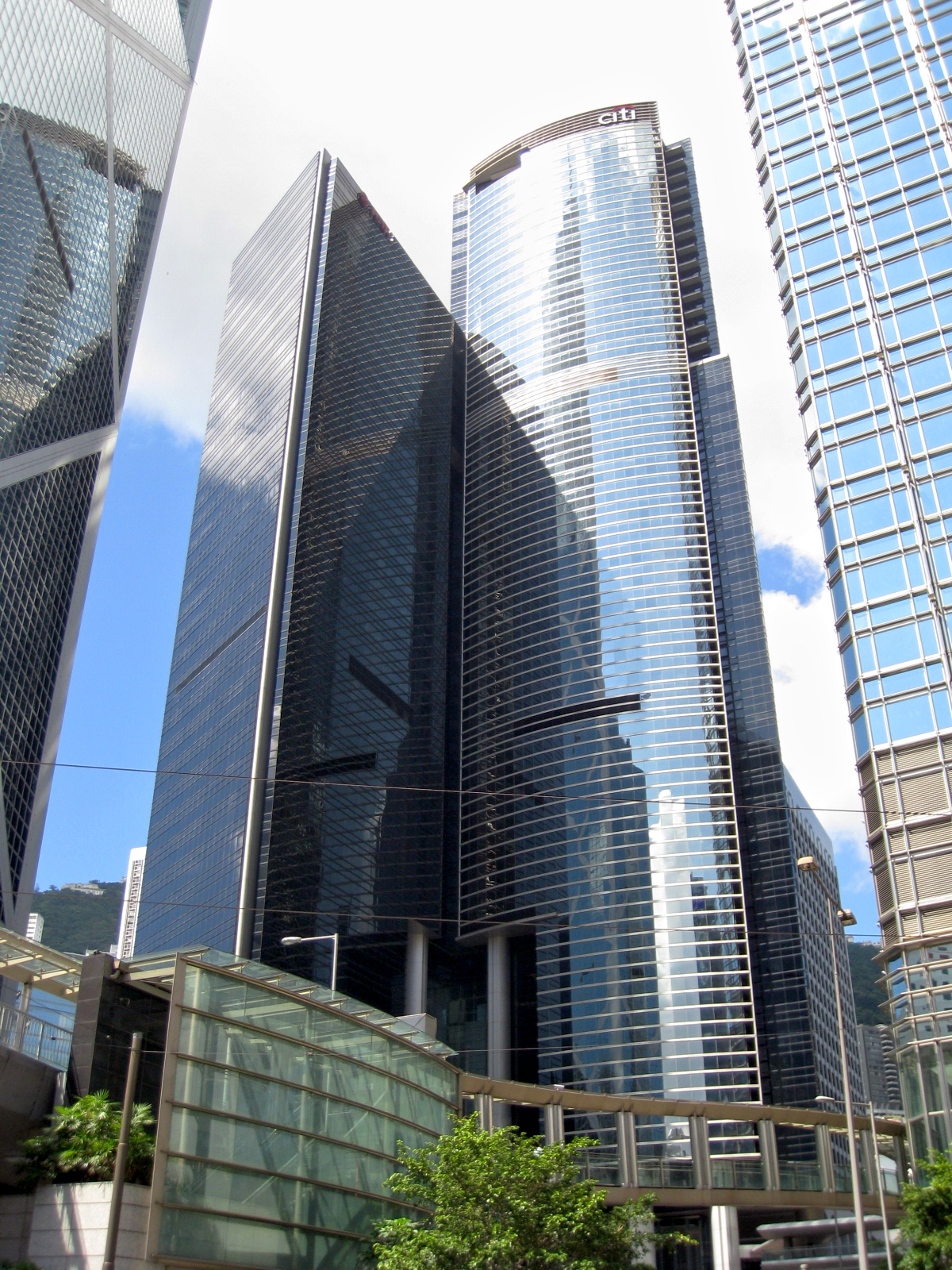
Citibank, N.A. Hong Kong branch office is located on the 50th floor of Champion Tower, 3 Garden Road, Central, Hong Kong

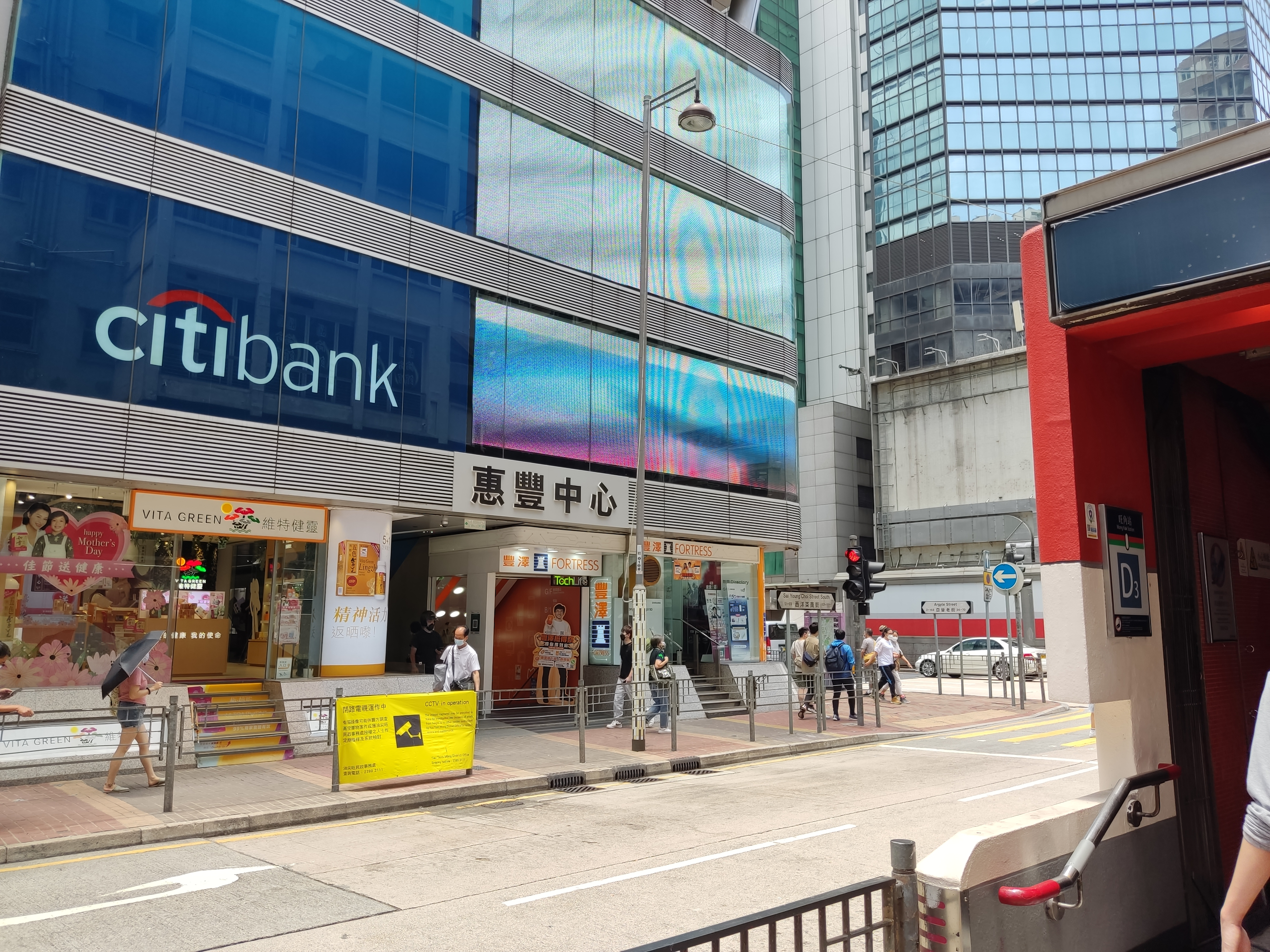
Citibank (Hong Kong) Mong Kok Branch

Citibank began operations in Hong Kong in 1902, the first US bank in the city and the first foreign bank in China.

=== Leadership history ===
- Regional Chief Executive: Peter Babej (since October 2019)
- Country Chief Executive: Aveline San (since August 2022)

==== Former Regional Chief Executives ====
The region-wide Chief Executive role was founded in 2008 and is based in Hong Kong.

1. Ajay Banga (2008–2009)
1. Shirish Apte and Stephen Bird (2009–2012)
1. Stephen Bird (2012–2015)
1. Francisco Aristeguieta (2015–2019)

==== Former Hong Kong and Macau Chief Executive Officers ====
List since the formation of the Hong Kong division in 1998.

1. Chan Tze-ching (1999–2003)
2. Catherine Weir (2003–2004)
3. Chan Tze-ching (2005–2007); second term
4. Sim S Lim (2007–2008)
5. Shengman Zhang (2008–2013)
6. Weber Lo (2013–2018)
7. Angel Ng (2018–2022)

== See also ==
- List of banks in Hong Kong
