= DBS Bank (Hong Kong) =

Licensed bank incorporated in Hong Kong

DBS Bank (Hong Kong) Limited
- Native name: 星展銀行 (香港) 有限公司
- Type: Subsidiary of DBS Group Holdings Ltd
- Industry: Banking
- Predecessor: Dao Heng Bank Limited; DBS Kwong On Bank Limited; Overseas Trust Bank Limited
- Founded: Hong Kong (July 21, 2003; 23 years ago)
- Headquarters: Hong Kong
- Key people: Peter Seah (Chairman); Tan Su Shan (Vice Chairman); Sebastian Paredes (CEO)
- Services: Financial services
- Operating income: ▲HKD11.9 billion (2018)
- Net income: ▲HKD5.1 billion (2018)
- Total assets: ▲HKD445.7 billion (2018)
- Total equity: ▼HKD38.0 billion (2018)
- Parent: DBS Group Holdings Ltd
- Website: www.dbs.com.hk

DBS Bank (Hong Kong) Limited (Chinese: 星展銀行 (香港) 有限公司) is a licensed bank incorporated in Hong Kong and is a subsidiary of DBS Bank headquartered in Singapore. As at 31 December 2025, it is the tenth-largest bank in Hong Kong by highest total assets.

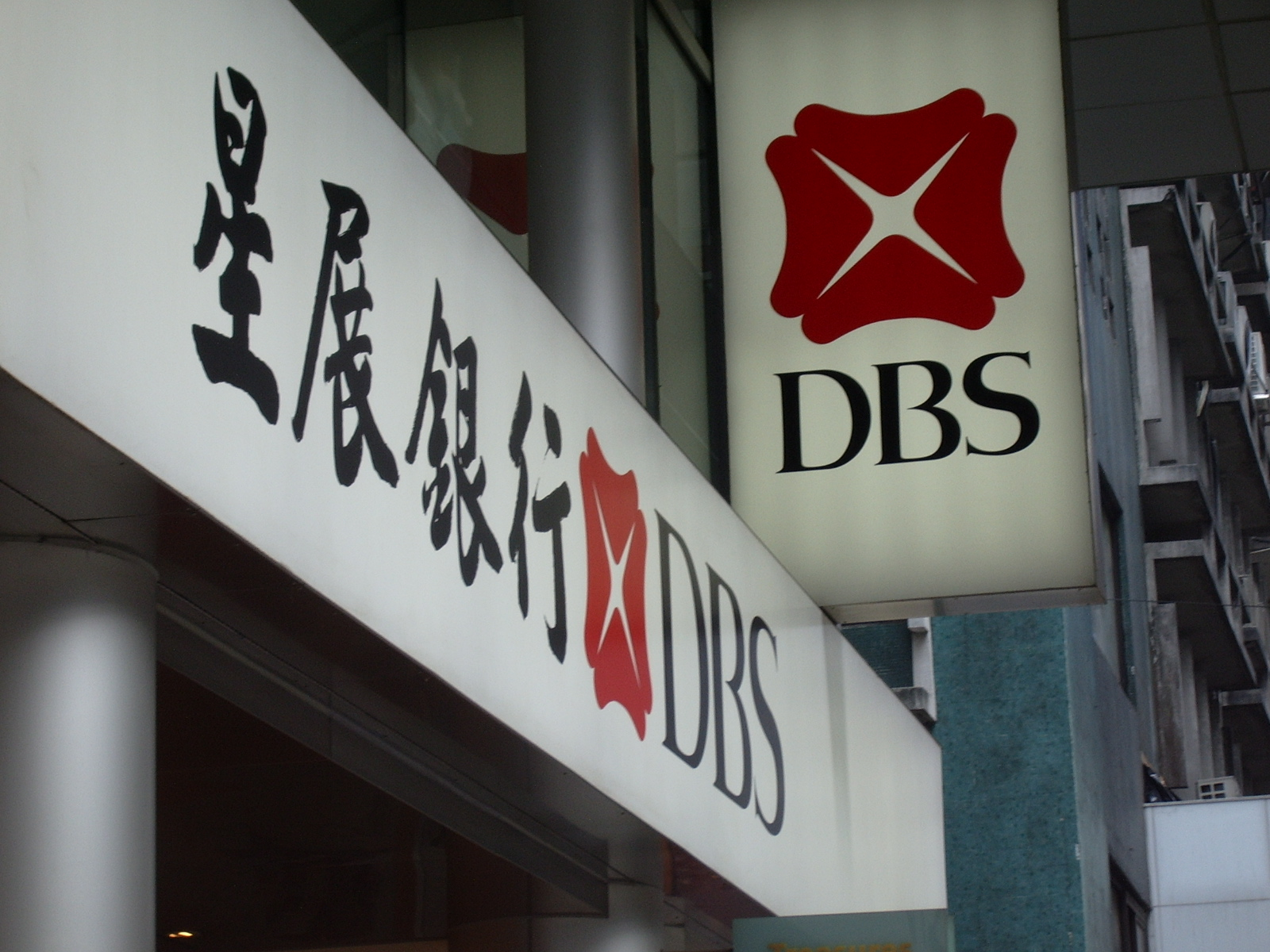
DBS Bank Branch on Des Voeux Road Central, Central, Hong Kong.

== History ==
In 1999, DBS Bank acquired Kwong On Bank and formed the DBS Kwong On Bank Limited. In 2001, DBS Bank acquired Dao Heng Bank, including its subsidiary, Overseas Trust Bank, from Guoco Group.

In 2003, DBS Bank merged the three banks, DBS Kwong On Bank Limited, Dao Heng Bank and Overseas Trust Bank, to form DBS Bank (Hong Kong) Limited.

In September 2010, Sebastian Paredes was appointed CEO of DBS Bank (Hong Kong) Limited.

On March 17, 2014, DBS Bank Ltd (DBS) announced to acquire the Asian private banking business of Societe Generale in Singapore and Hong Kong, as well as selected parts of its trust business. The business was successfully integrated into DBS in October 2014. The integration bolstered DBS’ private banking business in Hong Kong and North Asia.

On September 11, 2017, DBS Bank Ltd (DBS) successfully completed the acquisition of Australia and New Zealand Banking Group's retail and wealth business in Hong Kong.

On 2 February 2024, DBS Bank (Hong Kong) Limited announced the opening of its new DBS Treasures Centre at 18 Queen's Road Central. The new centre, spanning approximately 15,000 square feet, features a modern and luxurious design and is located in Hong Kong's central business district.

== Subsidiaries ==
- DBS Asia Capital Limited
- DBS Bank (Hong Kong) Limited - Macau Branch
- DBS Vickers (Hong Kong) Limited
- Hutchison DBS Card Limited

== Controversies ==
=== Safety deposit box fiasco (2004) ===
On October 5, 2004, DBS Bank (Hong Kong) Limited announced that, during the renovation of its branch in Mei Foo Sun Chuen, in Kowloon, when the bank attempted to remove more than 900 empty safety boxes from the branch, 83 safety boxes rented by customers and containing valuables were accidentally removed. The 83 boxes were subsequently sent to a scrapyard and crushed. The bank reported that 36 boxes were recovered, although the valuables contained inside were badly damaged.

In 2009, the safe deposit box fiasco was portrayed on TVB television series Born Rich.

=== HKMA fine (2024) ===
On 5 July 2024, DBS Bank (Hong Kong) Limited was fined HK$10 million (S$1.73 million) by Hong Kong Monetary Authority (HKMA) for lapses in adhering to anti-money laundering and counter-terrorist financing regulations. DBS Bank (Hong Kong) failed to continuously monitor business relationships and conduct enhanced due diligence in high risk situations. The bank also failed to keep records on some of its customers.

== See also ==
- List of banks in Hong Kong
