= Tai Sang Bank Limited =

Bank in Hong Kong (e. 1937)

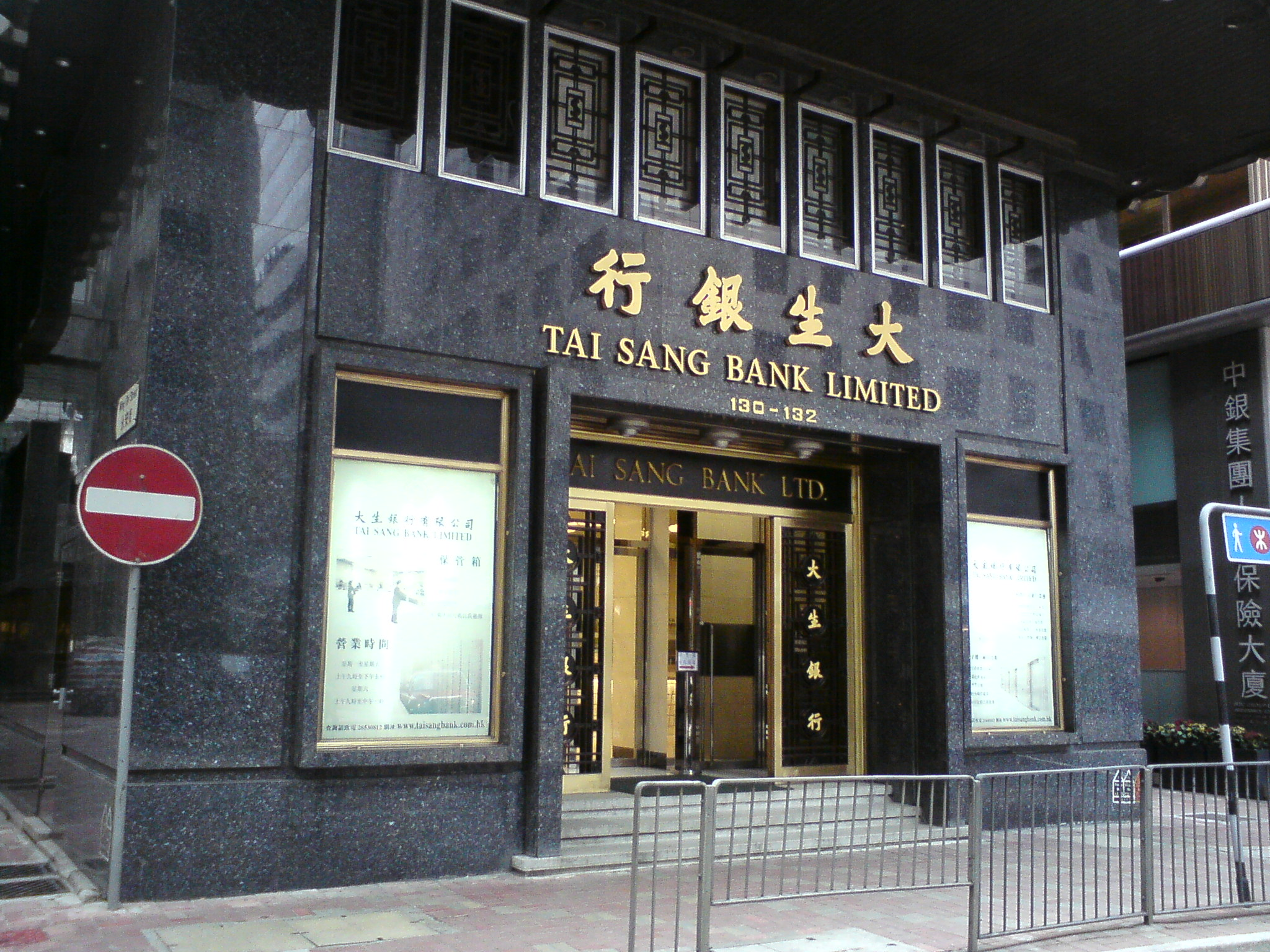
- Tai Sang Bank Limited headquarters.
- Native name: 大生銀行有限公司
- Company type: Bank
- Industry: Banking
- Founded: 1937; 89 years ago
- Founder: Ma Kam Chan Chinese: 馬錦燦
- Headquarters: 130-132, Des Voeux Road Central, City of Victoria, Hong Kong
- Key people: Ma Ching Hang, Patrick Chairman; Cheung Yau Shing Chief Executive
- Net income: HK$10,620,000 (2019)
- Number of employees: <50
- Website: Official website

Tai Sang Bank Limited is a licensed privately owned bank based in Hong Kong. The bank was established by Ma Kam-chan, a businessman from Kwangtung (now Guangdong), in 1937 after his family migrated to Hong Kong. Ma went on to serve as the chairman of the bank until he died in 1984. The bank is currently chaired by Patrick Ma Ching Hang. Tai Sang Bank is a member of the Hong Kong Association of Banks.

== Senior leadership ==
The bank is led by the chairman, and it has traditionally been a member of the majority-owner Ma family.

=== List of chairmen ===
1. Ma Kam-chan (1937–1984)
2. Ma Kam-ming (1984–2003)
3. William Ma Ching-wai (2003–2019)
4. Patrick Ma Ching-hang (since July 2019)

== Network ==
Tai Sang operates out of a single banking office on Des Voeux Road Central (德輔道中) and does not offer any online banking or ATM services. The bank largely relies on small-scale transactions and a high degree of customer service, providing more flexible solutions than larger lenders. The bank's main clients are brokers and gold traders. The bank also has two safe deposit box offices in Quarry Bay and Whampoa, and lets non-customers use them.

== US sanctions ==
As the United States imposed sanctions on a number of Mainland and Hong Kong officials (under the Hong Kong Human Rights and Democracy Act and the Hong Kong Autonomy Act) in the wake of the 2019 protests and the imposition of the National Security Law many multinational banks were no longer able to offer their services to those named in the sanction lists. This has increased the appeal of banks, such as Tai Sang, which do not operate outside the territory and therefore are less vulnerable to legal action for violating the sanctions.
