= Overseas Trust Bank =

Hong Kong bank

Overseas Trust Bank Limited Chinese: 海外信託銀行有限公司
- Type: Subsidiary of Dao Heng Bank
- Industry: Finance and insurance
- Founded: 1955
- Defunct: 2003
- Headquarters: 160 Gloucester Road, Wanchai, Hong Kong
- Products: Financial services

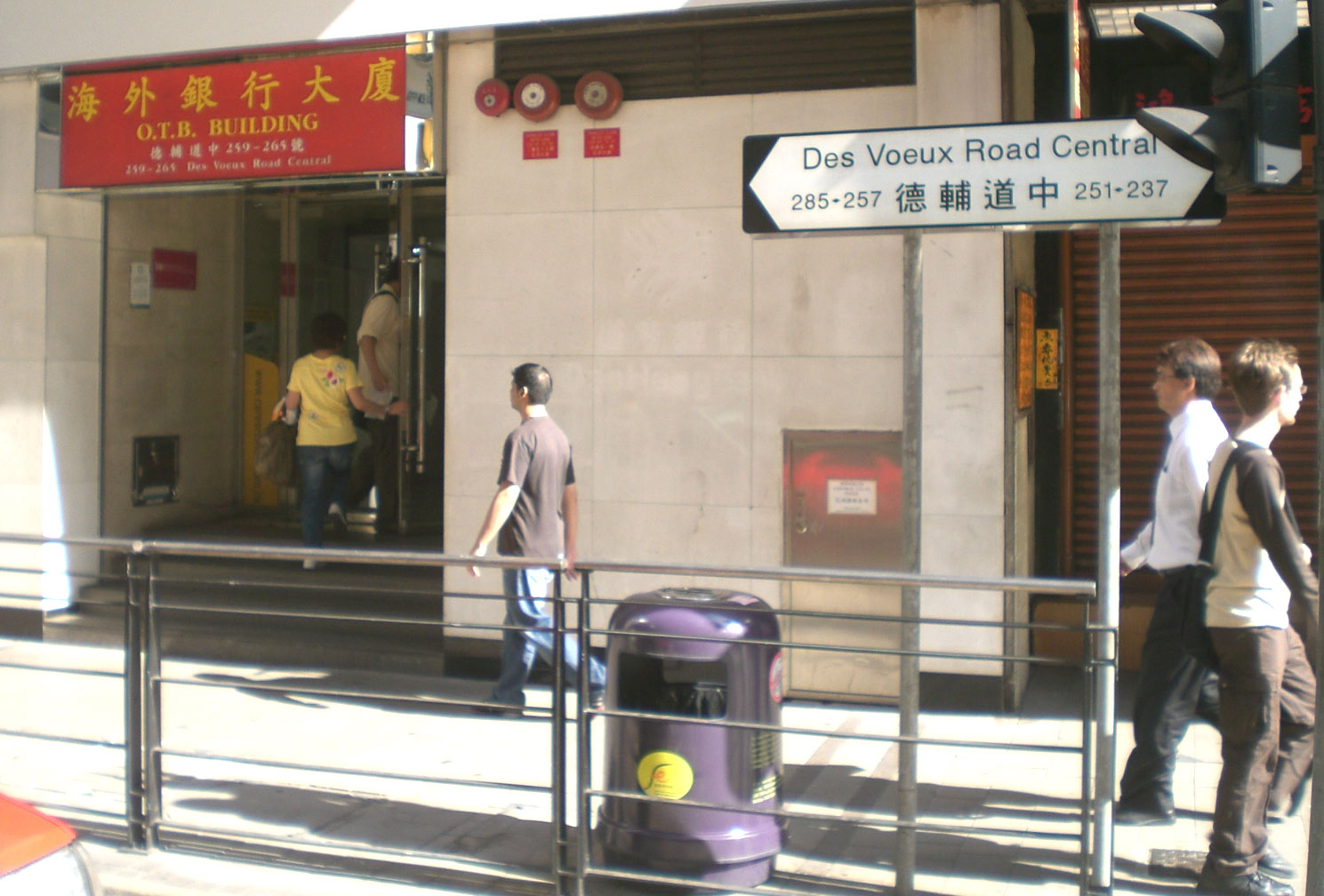
Former location of Sheung Wan Branch of Overseas Trust Bank

Overseas Trust Bank Limited (OTB) (Chinese: 海外信託銀行有限公司) was a bank in Hong Kong. It was established in 1955 by Chang Ming Thien, a Malaysian businessman and it was listed on the Hong Kong Stock Exchange in 1972. It was the fourth largest bank in Hong Kong before acquisition.

== Collapse and takeover by Government ==
On June 6, 1985, OTB suddenly announced that it was on the brink of collapse, due to its severe cash flow and bad debt problems. Bad debts held by the bank reached US$89.5 million. To recover the confidence of the public and investors of the Hong Kong banking system, the Hong Kong Government stepped in and took over OTB in the following day. From 1985 to 1986, the government ordered the Royal Hong Kong Police and ICAC to investigate the causes of OTB downfall. In May 1986, the former chairman of OTB, Patrick C.T. Chang, was arrested at the Hong Kong International Airport reportedly with a large amount of cash and jewellery. In 1987, Chang and OTB's former senior management were sentenced to jail by Hong Kong Law Court.

== Sold to Guoco ==
In 1993, the government sold OTB to Malaysian-owned Guoco Group for US$571 million. OTB became the subsidiary of Dao Heng Bank.

== Sold to and merged with DBS Bank ==
In 2001, Singaporean DBS Bank acquired and privatized Dao Heng Bank, together with OTB, from Guoco Group. In 2003, DBS Bank merged DBS Kwong On Bank, Dao Heng Bank and Overseas Trust Bank to form DBS Bank (Hong Kong) Limited.

== See also ==
- DBS Bank (Hong Kong)
- Dao Heng Bank
- Kwong On Bank
