= Bank of Dongguan =

Chinese commercial bank

Bank of Dongguan Co., Ltd

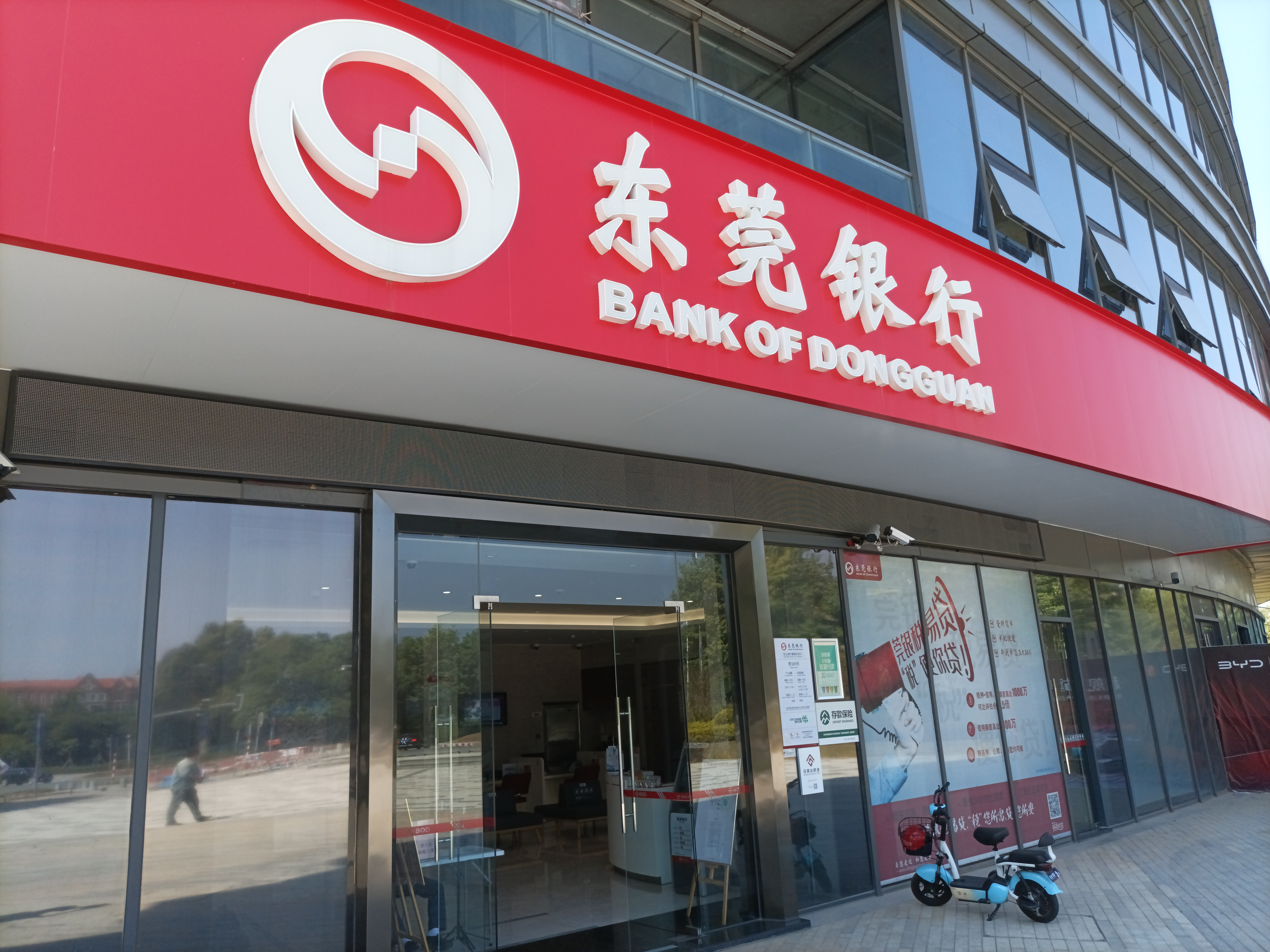
- Bank of Dongguan branch in Songshanhu Area
- Company type: Municipal commercial bank
- Founded: September 23, 1999 (26 years ago)
- Headquarters: 21 Tiyu Road, Dongguan, Guangdong
- Revenue: ▼CNY¥10.2 billion (US$1.58 billion) (2024)
- Operating income: ▲CNY¥3.93 billion (US$609.3 million)
- Net income: ▼CNY¥3.73 billion (US$578.76 million)
- Total assets: ▲CNY¥672.73 billion (US$104.3 billion)
- Total equity: ▲CNY¥43.64 billion (US$6.77 billion)
- Number of employees: ▲5,920
- Subsidiaries: Bank of Dongguan International Limited
- Website: dongguanbank.cn

Bank of Dongguan
- Traditional Chinese: 東莞銀行
- Simplified Chinese: 东莞银行
Transcriptions
Standard Mandarin
- Hanyu Pinyin: Dōngguǎn yínháng
Yue: Cantonese
- Jyutping: dung1 gun1 ngan4 hang4

Bank of Dongguan (simplified Chinese: 东莞银行; traditional Chinese: 東莞銀行), formerly known as Dongguan Commercial Bank, is a bank founded on September 23, 1999, and changed its name to its current name on March 24, 2008. Bank of Dongguan is one of China's regional commercial banks, headquartered in Dongguan. The bank's outlets are located in 32 towns (streets) in Dongguan, Guangzhou and Zhuhai; The Hong Kong Branch opened in September 2021, which is its first branch outside mainland China.

== History ==
- September 23, 1999: Dongguan City Commercial Bank was established.
- March 24, 2008: Dongguan City Commercial Bank was renamed Dongguan Bank.
- September 27, 2008: Dongguan Bank becomes the sponsor of the new season of Guangdong Hongyuan, the defending champion of the Chinese Men's Basketball Professional League. Guangdong Hongyuan would be called Guangdong Dongguan Bank after.
- December 16, 2008: Dongguan Bank Guangzhou Branch was established. The branch is located on the first floor of Fengxing Plaza, No. 240 Tianhe Road, Tianhe District, Guangzhou.
- November 8, 2013: Dongguan Bank Zhuhai Branch was established, with the branch address located at No. 385, Qinglu Middle Road, Xiangzhou District, Zhuhai City.
- November 1, 2019: Dongguan Bank obtained the naming rights of Dongguan Basketball Center.
- March 17, 2021: Dongguan Bank was granted a banking license by the Hong Kong Monetary Authority in accordance with the Hong Kong Banking Ordinance, and the former Hong Kong Representative Office was officially upgraded to a Hong Kong Branch.
- In August 2021, Dongguan Bank established Dongguan Bank International Co., Ltd. in Hong Kong. In October 2024, Dongguan Bank International was granted a banking license.
