= Guoco Group =

Investment holding company, Hongkong

Guoco Group Limited

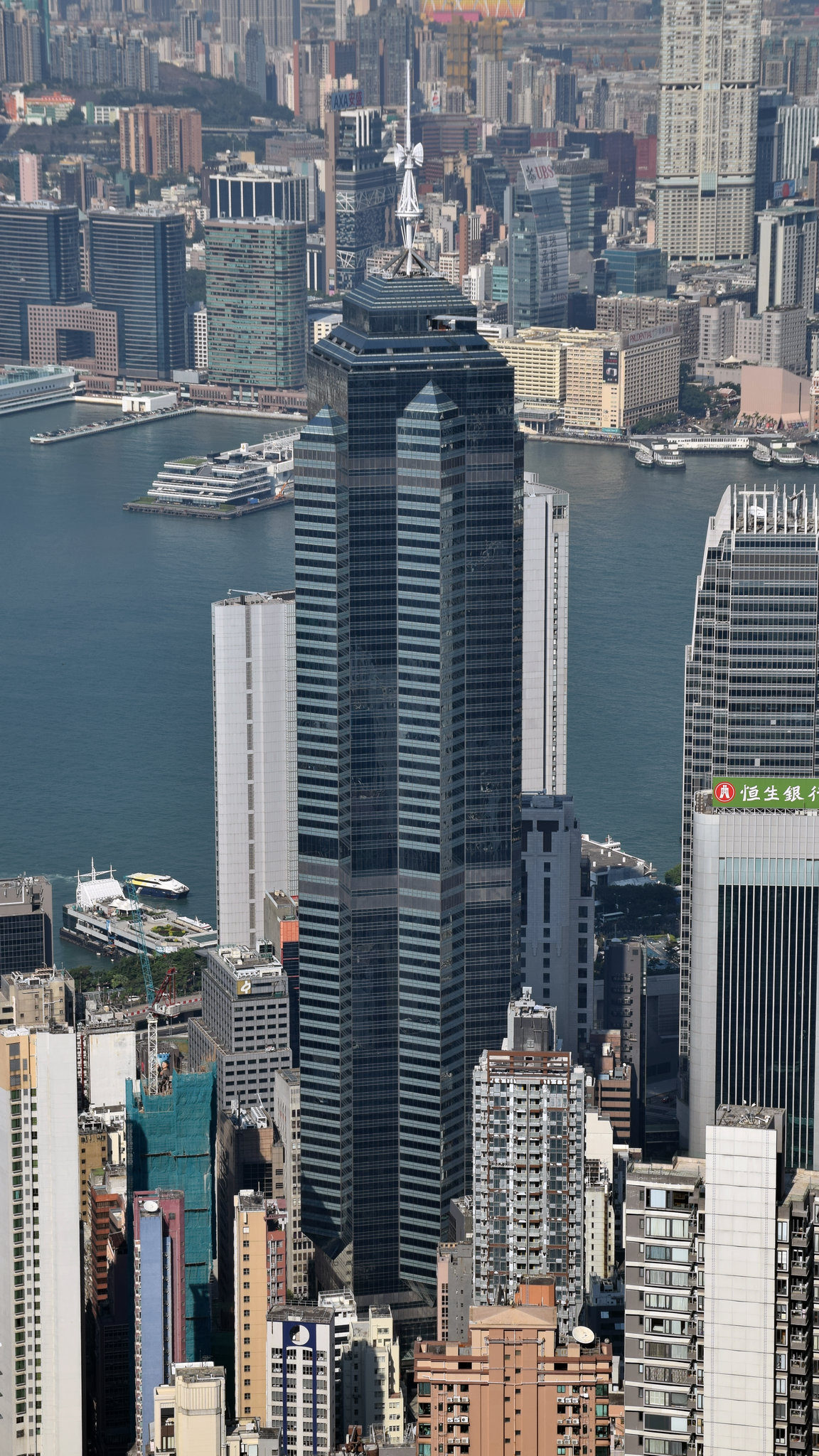
- Guoco Group is headquartered in Level 50 of The Center, Hong Kong
- Native name: 國浩集團有限公司
- Company type: Public
- Traded as: SEHK: 53
- Headquarters: 50th Floor, The Center, 99 Queen's Road Central, Hong Kong
- Key people: Kwek Leng Hai (Chairman); Chew Seong Aun (CFO)
- Net income: ▼US$ 250 million (2022); US$ 322 million (2021)
- Total assets: ▼US$ 16.6 billion (2022); US$ 16.9 billion (2021)
- Total equity: ▼US$ 7.70 billion (2022); US$ 7.36 billion (2021)
- Number of employees: 12,000
- Parent: Hong Leong Group
- Subsidiaries: GuocoLand Limited; GuocoLand (Malaysia) Berhad; GuocoLand (China) Limited
- Website: guoco.com

Guoco Group Limited (Chinese: 國浩集團有限公司, SEHK: 53) is an investment holding company. The principal activities of its subsidiaries and associated companies include investment and treasury management, property development and investment, stock and commodity broking, insurance, investment advisory, fund management as well as banking and finance, operating principally in Hong Kong, Singapore, Malaysia and Mainland China, etc. It is part of the Hong Leong Group, a conglomerate in Malaysia.

Guoco Group is incorporated in Bermuda and headquartered in Hong Kong.

== See also ==
- Dao Heng Bank
