= Security Pacific Bank =

United States bank

Security Pacific National Bank
- Logo, designed by Saul Bass, 1966
- Traded as: NYSE: SP
- Industry: Banking
- Predecessor: Security First National Bank
- Founded: 1967 (as Security Pacific National Bank)
- Defunct: April 22, 1992; 34 years ago
- Fate: Merged into the Bank of America Corporation
- Successor: Bank of America
- Headquarters: Los Angeles, California
- Area served: Western U.S.
- Subsidiaries: Rainier Bank

Security Pacific National Bank (SPNB) was a large U.S. bank headquartered in Los Angeles, California. It was acquired by Bank of America in 1992.

== History ==
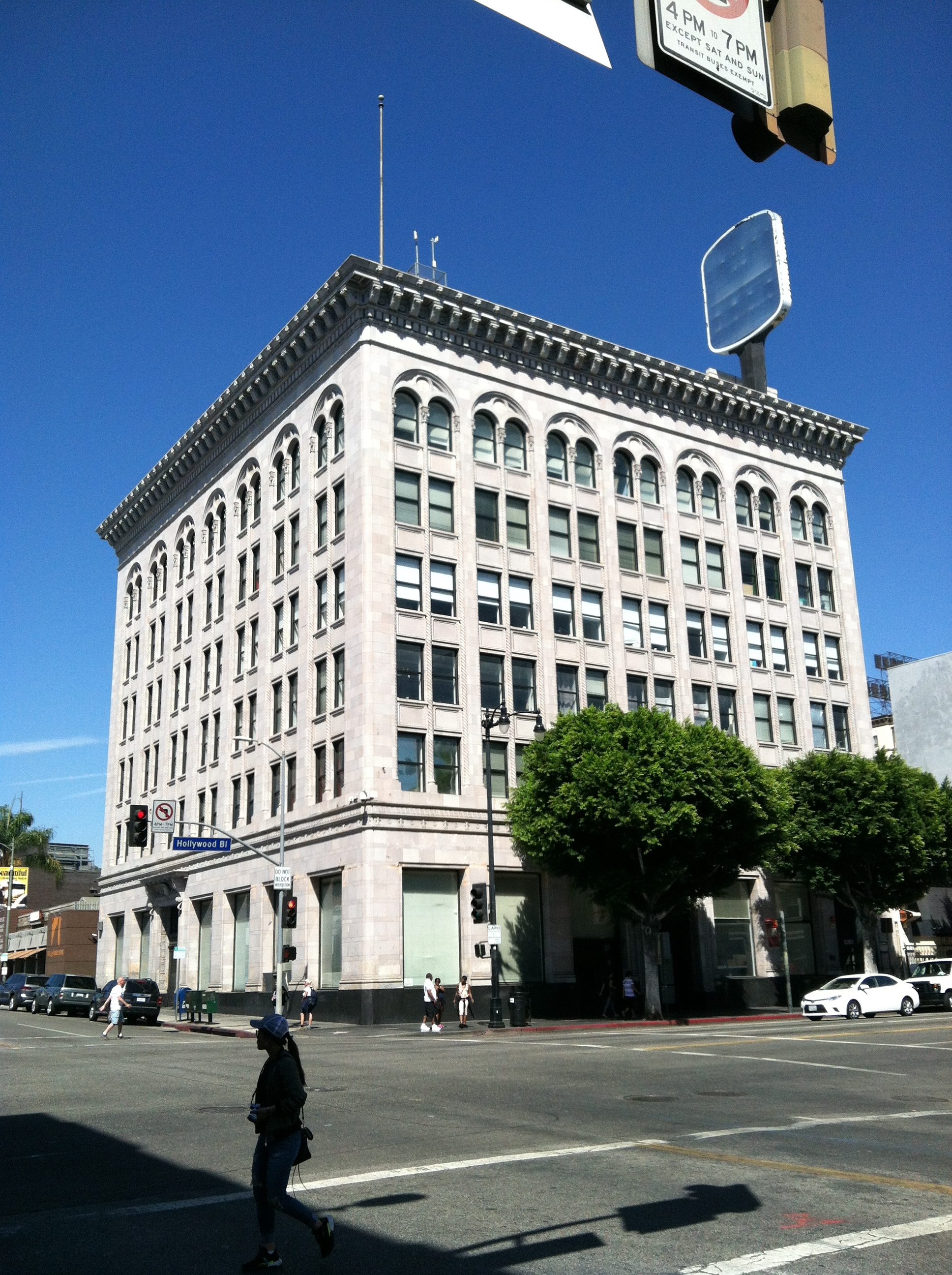
Security Trust and Savings, Hollywood Blvd., California

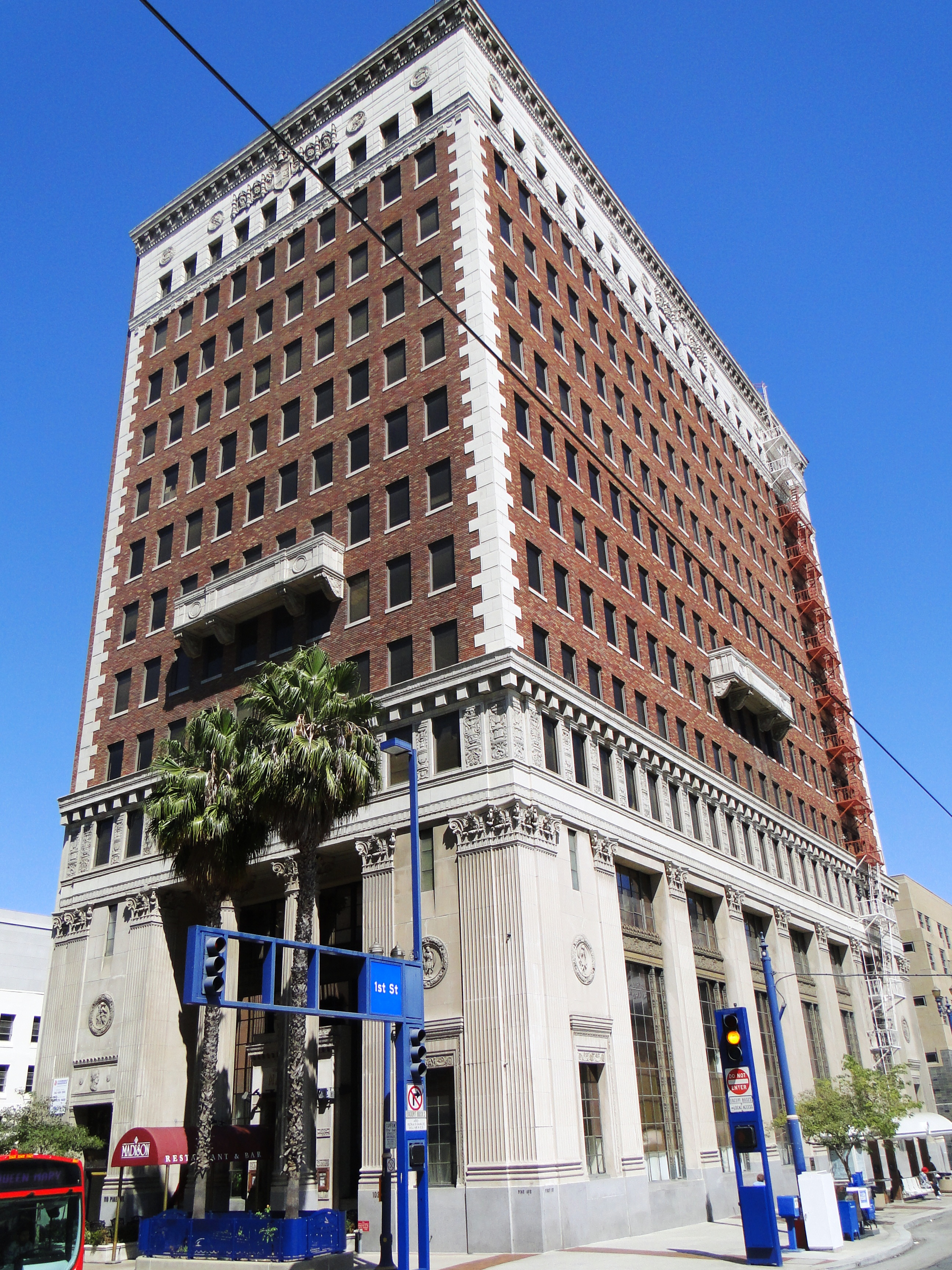
Security Pacific National Bank Building in Downtown Long Beach, constructed 1924

On September 1, 1868, Hellman, Temple & Co. established its first banking office in Los Angeles. The banking firm was the predecessor of Farmers and Merchants Bank of Los Angeles (1870). The bank earned a reputation for aggressive business practices and benefited from economic and population growth in the Western United States.

Farmers and Merchants Bank of Los Angeles was acquired by Security First National (itself created by the 1929 merger of Security Trust and Savings and First National Bank) in 1956. In 1968, Security First National merged with Pacific National Bank of San Francisco and became Security Pacific National Bank.

In 1971, SPNB Security Pacific National Bank (SPNB) bought 69% of Bank of Canton. In 1975, Security Pacific Bank constructed a 55-story tower in downtown Los Angeles, now known as Bank of America Plaza.

In 1978, computer consultant Stanley Rifkin learned the electronic codes Security Pacific used to telegraph funds to other banks. On October 25 he stole $10,200,000 from a non-existent account, executing one of the largest bank robberies in history. He used the funds to buy some 115,000 Russian diamonds in Switzerland, which he smuggled back into the United States and attempted to sell, but he was captured. Security Pacific took ownership of the diamonds but received few offers for such a large quantity. Eventually it was forced to sell them on unfavorable terms to a Liechtenstein firm affiliated with the De Beers company.

On May 9, 1980, five men robbed the Security Pacific branch in Norco, California. They were among the most heavily armed bank robbers in history, carrying semi-automatic firearms, handguns, and improvised explosive devices, and succeeded not only in stopping several patrol cars but forcing a San Bernardino police helicopter to give up pursuit. By the end of the Norco shootout, a police officer and two robbers had been killed, with the other three suspects arrested and sentenced to life in prison.

In 1984, the boards of SPNB and Bank of Canton announced that SPNB wanted to acquire the ordinary and preferred shares of the Bank of Canton it did not already own. The agreement stipulated that the management of Bank of Canton would remain in place and that Russell Fok would continue as chairman of the board. Furthermore, a company associated with Fok would be entitled, upon completion of the acquisition, to purchase a limited equity position in BoC. SPNB agreed to pay $59.31 per share for the 714,128 common shares (31%) that it did not already own for a total cost of about $42 million.

In 1985, a class action lawsuit against Security Pacific accused it of overcharging some 2,500 trust accounts going back to 1974. Also in 1985, Security Pacific acquired The Arizona Bank.

In 1986, SPNB acquired California Pacific National Bank, a small bank that primarily served Los Angeles' Chinese business community, for US$11.5 million. Earlier, BoC had revealed plans for a major expansion in the United States, concentrating on the growing Asian community in California. SPNB also entered into talks with American Asian Bank. This Chinese ethnic bank operated four branches around San Francisco and four in the Los Angeles area.

In 1987, Security Pacific acquired Rainier Bancorp, which served the Pacific Northwest.

In 1988, Security Pacific denied a job to hacker Kevin Mitnick for his failure to disclose prior convictions. Four days later, a false press release circulated stating that the bank had lost $400 million in the first quarter, hurting the bank's share price. The Federal Bureau of Investigation attempted to use this circumstantial evidence in their case against Mitnick, but no proof of a connection was ever uncovered. Mitnick, in particular, denied the allegation in his book Ghost in the Wires, saying it was not his style, while admitting other crimes unrelated to the bank.

Also in 1988 SPNB completed the acquisition of Bank of Canton and renamed it Security Pacific Asian Bank. SPNB finally acquired American Asian Bank, controlled by individuals associated with the ailing Hong Kong–based Tung Group. (Earlier American Asian had acquired a portion of the failed American City Bank in 1983 and Toronto Dominion Bank of California in 1984).

The 1980s boom for a time sustained the bank, but its aggressive acquisition strategy, unfavorable financial engineering arrangements, and the 1990 recession and Southern California real estate crash devastated its loan portfolio and balance sheet. Banking regulators, concerned problems at Security Pacific could compound the emerging savings and loan crisis, placed the bank under heightened scrutiny.

On April 22, 1992, Security Pacific Bank merged with San Francisco–based BankAmerica (now called Bank of America), a deal that was at the time one of the largest bank mergers in history. Federal regulators, however, forced the sale of Security Pacific's Washington subsidiary, Rainier Bank, as the combination of Seafirst and Rainier would have given BankAmerica too large a share of the market in that state. The Rainier Bank branches were divided and sold off to West One Bancorp (now U.S. Bancorp) and KeyBank. Later that year, BankAmerica expanded into Nevada by acquiring Valley Bank of Nevada.

In 1993, Bank of America changed Security Pacific Asian Bank's name to Bank of America (Asia). In 1994 Arab-Malaysian Bank acquired Security Pacific Asian Bank operations in Malaysia.

In 2000, Robert H. Smith, Security Pacific's last chairman and CEO, published a book called Dead Bank Walking: One Gutsy Bank's Struggle For Survival And The Merger That Changed Banking Forever, which chronicled the merger with Bank of America.

== New Security Pacific Bank ==
A new Security Pacific Bank emerged in February 2005, the result of a name change by a bank formerly known as Network Bank USA and, prior to that, Golden Pacific Bank. The new Security Pacific Bank (which failed on November 7, 2008) had no relation to Bank of America or the former Security Pacific National Bank, although it did use a similar interlocking "S" logo as the former bank. After its closure, it was acquired by Pacific Western Bank.
