= Dao Heng Bank =

Hong Kong bank holding company

Dao Heng Bank Group Limited
- Native name: 道亨銀行集團有限公司
- Company type: Public
- Traded as: SEHK: 223 (delisted on 4 September 2001)
- Industry: Banking
- Founded: Hong Kong (September 21, 1990) (Dao Heng Bank Limited was established in 1921)
- Fate: Acquired and privatised by DBS Group Holdings Ltd in 2001
- Headquarters: Hong Kong
- Area served: Hong Kong
- Key people: Quek Leng Chan (Executive Chairman); Kwek Leng Hai (Managing Director); Randolph Gordon Sullivan (Director)
- Services: Financial services
- Net income: ▲HK$1,730,084,000 (2000); ▼HK$1,203,301,000 (1999); ▼HK$1,255,314,000 (1998); ▲HK$2,119,708,000 (1997); ▲HK$1,505,811,000 (1996); ▲HK$1,203,113,000 (1995); ▲HK$1,133,977,000 (1994); ▲HK$400,857,000 (1993); ▲HK$320,451,000 (1992); HK$232,014,000 (1991)
- Total assets: ▲HK$141,986,429,000 (2000); ▲HK$131,876,313,000 (1999); ▼HK$122,934,242,000 (1998); ▲HK$125,485,256,000 (1997); ▲HK$103,480,286,000 (1996); ▲HK$82,213,503,000 (1995); ▲HK$66,889,359,000 (1994); ▲HK$31,854,378,000 (1993); ▲HK$25,419,953,000 (1992); HK$19,641,593,000 (1991)
- Total equity: ▲HK$12,542,569,000 (2000); ▲HK$11,656,833,000 (1999); ▲HK$11,073,988,000 (1998); ▲HK$10,600,880,000 (1997); ▲HK$9,234,417,000 (1996); ▲HK$7,223,192,000 (1995); ▲HK$6,016,680,000 (1994); ▲HK$1,949,970,000 (1993); ▲HK$1,808,814,000 (1992); HK$1,648,018,000 (1991)
- Number of employees: ▲~3,300 (2000); ~3,100 (1999)
- Parent: Guoco Group Limited
- Subsidiaries: Dao Heng Bank Limited (renamed DBS Bank (Hong Kong) Limited on 21 July 2003); Overseas Trust Bank Limited (merged into DBS Bank (Hong Kong) Limited on 21 July 2003)
- Website: www.daoheng.com

Logo of former Dao Heng Bank

Dao Heng Bank Group Limited (former stock code: SEHK: 223) (Chinese: 道亨銀行集團有限公司) was a bank holding company in Hong Kong and it had two major subsidiaries before being acquired, Dao Heng Bank Limited and Overseas Trust Bank Limited.

Dao Heng Bank Limited was established in Hong Kong in 1921. It was acquired by Guoco Group (a member of the Hong Leong Group) in 1982 and was listed on the Hong Kong Stock Exchange in 1983. In 1989, it acquired Hang Lung Bank from the Hong Kong Government. In 1993, it acquired Overseas Trust Bank from the Hong Kong Government. Instrumental in this merger, which Euromoney Magazine called "The Deal of the Year", was Managing Director Mr. Werner M. M. Makowski. A deal which led to Dao Heng Bank Group's listing on the Hong Kong Stock Exchange to be 277 times over-subscribed. On 6 December 1999, it joined to be Hang Seng Index Constituent Stocks (blue chip), making it one of the 4 leading banks that were HSI constituents. In 2001, Singaporean DBS Bank acquired Dao Heng Bank from Guoco Group, then privatized and delisted it. On 21 July 2003, DBS Bank merged Dao Heng Bank, DBS Kwong On Bank and Overseas Trust Bank to form DBS Bank (Hong Kong) Limited.

== See others ==
- DBS Bank (Hong Kong)
- Kwong On Bank
- Overseas Trust Bank
