= Kwong On Bank =

Hong Kong–based bank

- 廣安銀行有限公司
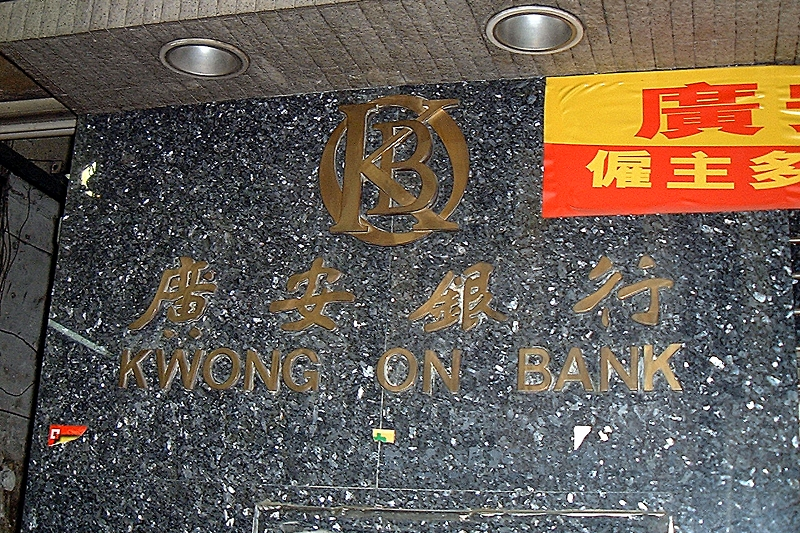
- Brass logo of Kwong on Bank, Shau Kei Wan Branch.
- Merged into: DBS Bank (Hong Kong) Limited
- Formation: 1935; 91 years ago
- Founder: Dr Leung Ding Bong
- Dissolved: 2003; 23 years ago
- Location: Hong Kong

Kwong On Bank
- Traditional Chinese: 廣安銀行有限公司
Transcriptions
Yue: Cantonese
- Yale Romanization: Gwóng ōn ngàhn hòhng yáuh haahn gūng sī
- Jyutping: Gwong2 on1 ngan4 hong4 jau5 haan6 gung1 si1

Kwong On Bank Limited (KOB) (former stock code: SEHK: 1115) (Chinese: 廣安銀行有限公司) was a Hong Kong–based bank. It was established in 1935 by Mr Leung Kwai-Yee and later run by his son, Dr. Leung Ding Bong, the President of the former Urban Council of Hong Kong, and Japan-based Fuji Bank, and his family. It was acquired and privatised by DBS Bank and renamed as DBS Kwong On Bank Limited in 1999. DBS Bank merged DBS Kwong On Bank, Dao Heng Bank and Overseas Trust Bank to form DBS Bank (Hong Kong) Limited in 2003.

== See also ==
- DBS Bank (Hong Kong)
- Dao Heng Bank
- Overseas Trust Bank
