= Bank of Canton =

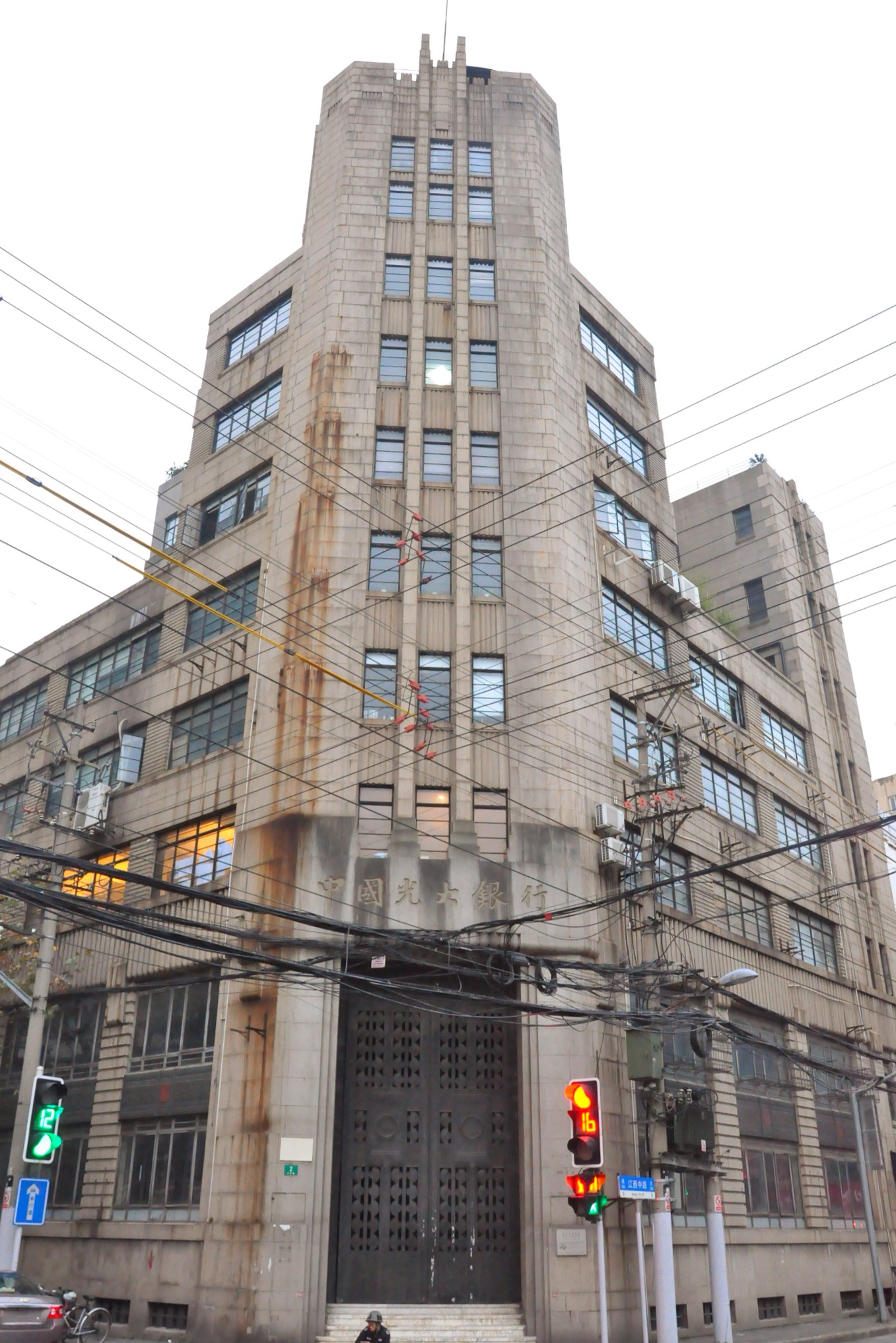
- Tower of the Bank of Canton in Shanghai
- Founded: 1912 in Canton, China
- Founder: P. T. Huo et al.
- Defunct: 1988
- Fate: Acquired by SPNB
- Successors: Security Pacific Asia Bank; Bank of America (Asia); China Construction Bank
- Headquarters: Central, Hong Kong

Bank of Canton (Chinese: 廣東銀行) was established in 1912 in Canton but registered as a British company in Hong Kong. This made it the first Chinese-owned bank in Hong Kong. At the time, all the other banks in Hong Kong were foreign, primarily British, including the locally incorporated but British-run Hongkong and Shanghai Banking Corporation. Security Pacific National Bank (SPNB) bought a majority share in Bank of Canton in 1971. In 1988, Security Pacific succeeded in wholly acquiring Bank of Canton, which became Security Pacific Asia Bank. When Bank of America acquired Security Pacific Corporation in 1993, it changed Security Pacific Asia Bank's name to Bank of America (Asia). China Construction Bank acquired Bank of America (Asia) in 2006.

== History ==
In 1912, several Chinese residents of the US, including members of the Fok (Huo) family (P.T. Huo), founded the Bank of Canton (BoC), which became the first wholly Chinese-owned bank in China. BoC opened branches in Shanghai (1917). After the end of World War I, BoC opened a branch in Bangkok in 1921 and an agency in New York that became a branch in 1922 and that closed in 1931. In 1922, it also opened branches in Hankou and Shantou. The Chinese branches issued bank notes denominated in local currency dollars, with the Shanghai branch even issuing a 500-dollar note.

In 1935, China went off the silver standard; BoC was one of the banks that consequently failed. At the time it had branches in San Francisco, Bangkok, Shanghai, Canton and Hankou. The next year T.V. Soong reorganized the BoC, and it reopened, but without the right to issue. The Bank of Canton incorporated a subsidiary on 1 July 1936 in Macau, making it one of the longest-established banks in Macau.

In 1939, the government of Siam (Thailand), during an outbreak of widespread anti-Chinese feeling, closed the local branch of Oversea-Chinese Banking Corporation and the branches of BoC, charging the banks with facilitating illegal remittances by Chinese residents.

- 1953 BoC opened a branch in Singapore.
- 1968 By this time, BoC had already established branches in Malaysia and re-entered Thailand.
- 1971 Security Pacific National Bank (SPNB) bought 69% of BoC.
- 1978 SPNB tried to acquire the remaining shares but talks broke down.
- 1979 BoC had nine licensed branches in HK and one each in Bangkok, Thailand, Kuala Lumpur and Singapore. In addition, it owned a banking subsidiary in Macau.
- 1984 The boards of SPNB and BoC announced that SPNB wanted to acquire the ordinary and preference shares of the Bank of Canton it did not already own. The agreement stipulated that the management of Bank of Canton would remain in place and that Russell Fok would continue as chairman of the board. Furthermore, a company associated with Fok would be entitled, upon completion of the acquisition, to purchase a limited equity position in BoC. SPNB agreed to pay $59.31 per share for the 714,128 common shares (31%) that it did not already own for a total cost of about $42 million.
- 1988 SPNB completed the acquisition of Bank of Canton and renamed it Security Pacific Asia Bank.
- 1992 Bank of America acquired Security Pacific Corporation, and in 1993 changed Security Pacific Asia Bank's name to Bank of America (Asia).
- 1994 Bank of America sold Security Pacific Asia Bank's operations in Malaysia to Arab-Malaysian Bank.
- 2006 China Construction Bank acquired Bank of America (Asia).
