= Li Ming (banker) =

Chinese Banker (1887–1966)

Li Ming 李銘
- Born: Li Fusheng (李福生); November 24, 1887; Shaoxing, Zhejiang, China
- Died: October 22, 1966 (aged 78); Hong Kong
- Resting place: Hong Kong Buddhist Cemetery, Chai Wan
- Education: Wayland Academy; Yamaguchi Commercial College
- Occupation: Banker
- Spouse(s): Wu Huiying (吳蕙英) b.1893-d.1938
- Writing career
- Period: Republican Era

Li Ming (李銘; November 24, 1887 – October 22, 1966) was a Chinese banking and investing pioneer. He formed the Chekiang Industrial Bank in 1922 and was General Manager and later Chairman until 1949. In 1950 he founded the Chekiang First Bank Ltd. in Hong Kong, and served as Chairman until his death in 1966. Over the course of his career he held more than thirty directorships in banks, industrial concerns, insurance companies and public utilities, and served in many key governmental positions of financial administration. He was a founder and Chairman of the Shanghai Bankers' Association.

== Biography ==
Li Ming was born in Shaoxing, Zhejiang ("Chekiang" in Wade-Giles), in 1887, the second son of a silver merchant. Following a traditional education in the Chinese Classics, in 1902 he attended the American Baptist missionary-run Wayland Academy, Hangzhou. He went on in 1905 to study banking and commerce at the Yamaguchi Commercial College (山口高等商業学校 Yamaguchi kōtō shōgyō gakkō), Japan, on a government scholarship. As part of his studies, Li Ming interned at the Yokohama Specie Bank, Ltd., which had been authorized in 1884 by the Ministry of Finance to manage Japan's foreign exchange. The bank's important role in foreign trade, especially with China, provided Li Ming with valuable exposure to foreign financial dealings.

After graduating in 1910, he returned to China and obtained a job as an auditor in the Chekiang Provincial and Industrial Bank, in Hangzhou. In 1911 he became Manager of the bank's Shanghai office, where he distinguished himself by rapidly expanding the bank's business. However, he saw the disadvantages of the bank's dual role as a semi-governmental enterprise, due to the continual demands placed on it by the provincial authorities. He was able to negotiate with the provincial government and the private shareholders for a reorganization in 1922 whereby the bank was split into two successor banks – the Provincial Bank of Chekiang, owned solely by the provincial government, and the Chekiang Industrial Bank, a private banking firm with its head office in Shanghai.

Li Ming concentrated his energies on the Chekiang Industrial Bank, of which he became General Manager. The bank operated only two branches, in Hankou and in Hangzhou, to avoid the risk of additional branches in politically unstable areas becoming liabilities. His management policy further emphasized concentration, liquidity and prudent investment. Due to China's lacking a central banking system, he believed it necessary that commercial banks hold reserve funds sufficient to meet all obligations at any given time, and so he maintained a stringent loan policy. Chekiang Industrial Bank was one of the first Chinese banks to engage in foreign exchange and international trade operations, and under his management grew to become one of the five leading private banks in China.

As acknowledged leader of the so-called "Zhejiang Bankers", in 1926 he was elected Chairman of the Shanghai Bankers Association, which he had helped found in 1918; he held this post to 1934 and again from 1946 to 1949. Beginning in 1927 and until 1940 he also chaired the newly established "National Bonds Sinking Fund Committee", responsible for the custody and servicing of National Government treasury notes and domestic bonds. He became Chairman of the Board of Directors of the Bank of China in 1928 when it was reorganized as a foreign-exchange bank, with Chang Kia-ngau as General Manager. When the bank was nationalized in 1935 both men resigned. Also in 1928, he became a Director of the Bank of Communications and Chairman of the Board of Supervisors of the Central Bank of China, which he had helped to organize.

As a response to the financial panic and runs on the banks caused by the outbreak of fighting between Japanese and Chinese armed forces within Shanghai in 1932, Li Ming took the lead in forming the Joint Reserve Board of the Shanghai Bankers Association. The assets contributed by the member banks enabled the Joint Reserve Board to issue notes and certificates that provided liquidity sufficient to calm the financial panic. He also sponsored the establishment, as subsidiary organs of the Joint Reserve Board, of the Shanghai Clearing House in 1933 and the Shanghai Bankers Acceptance House in 1936.

Li Ming organized the National Industrial Syndicate in 1932 to further China's economic development. This banking syndicate purchased an existing electric company at Hangzhou, modernized and expanded its physical plant, and reorganized it as the Hangchow (Hangzhou) Electricity Company, for which he served as chairman of the board until 1949. Also, believing that foreign capital and technology were needed to quicken the pace of development, Li Ming worked to promote economic cooperation between Chinese and foreign companies. Among the major examples of such joint investments were the purchases in the early 1930s of the Shanghai International Settlement's electric power system and of the Shanghai Mutual Telephone Company.

When the Shanghai Municipal Council decided to sell its electric power system in 1929, the American and Foreign Power Company of New York formed a syndicate to purchase it, and Li Ming participated as one of the syndicate members representing Chinese interests. Following the purchase, serving as principal advisor to the company he formed a group composed of Chinese, British and American banks, and the American brokerage firm of Swan, Culbertson and Fritz, to raise additional funds for modernization and expansion of the new Shanghai Power Company, by underwriting issuance of the company's bonds and preferred stock. This purchase marked the introduction of such western banking practices as investigating proposals, forming syndicates for underwriting, selling securities, and investment counseling, to the Chinese banking system. Similarly, Li Ming formed a syndicate for the International Telephone and Telegraph Company purchase of the Shanghai Mutual Telephone Company in 1930, and became a member of the Board of Directors from 1933 to 1949.

Under direct threat of arrest by the Japanese-backed government under Wang Jingwei at Nanjing, Li Ming left Shanghai in March 1941 and took refuge in the United States until the end of World War II in 1945. While in New York he played a leading role in organizing China Industries Inc., in conjunction with K. P. Chen of the Shanghai Commercial and Savings Bank, Lehman Brothers, Lazard Freres and the Rockefeller interests, to facilitate the financing of postwar Chinese industrial enterprises. Unfortunately, this organization was never able to become operative due to the outbreak of civil war in China, and it was dissolved in 1949. During his stay in the United States he also became a New York member of the Board of Trustees of the Peking Union Medical College and a Trustee of the China Foundation, served as an Adviser to the Chinese Delegation to the United Nations Monetary and Financial Conference at Bretton Woods, and as a Chinese Employers' Delegate to the International Labor Conference at Philadelphia.

After his return to post-war Shanghai in 1946, Li Ming continued to control the Chekiang Industrial Bank as Chairman of the Board of Directors. The bank was renamed Chekiang First Bank of Commerce in 1948 in compliance with 1947 legislation requiring bank names to reflect their primary functions. He served a short while as Chairman of the Central Bank of China's Import and Export Control Board, but the political situation was rapidly deteriorating and in 1949 he relocated to Hong Kong. Once in Hong Kong he founded the Chekiang First Bank Ltd. on August 11, 1950, becoming chairman of its board of directors until his death in Hong Kong in 1966. He was succeeded as Chairman by his second son Li Dexian (李德䤼; Li Te-chuan) who led the Bank from 1966 to 1978.

== Family ==
Li Ming married Wu Huiying (吳蕙英; 1893–1938) of Hangzhou in 1912. She was the daughter of Wu Yanjue (吳延爵), a lawyer and music educator, and Shu Peiyun (舒珮雲), the daughter of a leading Hangzhou fan manufacturer. Their children include: Bessie (Shih Li Yueqing; 施李月卿; married Szeming Sze), a financial advisor and pianist; Deqing (李德慶), an MIT-educated electrical engineer and power plant administrator in China; Maeching Li Kao (高李梅卿; m. George Kao), a social worker and cookbook author; and, Dexian (李德䤼), a banker. A nephew, Wu Guanghan (吳光漢), was a civil engineer who was instrumental in the launching of the China International Trust Investment Corporation (CITIC) under Rong Yiren, and who led the 1981 construction of its headquarters in Beijing, the CITIC Building, and many other major building projects in China that followed. Grandchildren include Chia-Ming Sze (施家銘), an architect specializing in affordable housing for elderly and special needs residents, including several major developments in Boston Chinatown. Great Grandchildren include David Sze (施利明), a leading venture capitalist and Managing Partner at the firm of Greylock Partners; and, Sarah Sze (施雪蓮), a MacArthur Fellowship recipient and Columbia University Professor of Visual Arts.

== Sources ==
- Biographical Dictionary of Republican China; Boorman, Howard L. (ed.), 1968; Columbia University Press: New York; ISBN 0-231-04558-1; OCLC 659836309
- The Shanghai Capitalists and the Nationalist Government 1927–1937; Coble, Jr., Parks M., 1980; Harvard East Asian monographs, 94; Council on East Asian Studies, Harvard University: Cambridge, MA; distributed by Harvard University Press; ISBN 0-674-80535-6; OCLC 13792135
- 上海名人辞典 Shanghai ming ren cidian; Wu Chengping 吴成平 (ed.), 2000; 上海辞书出版社 Shanghai cishu chuban she: Shanghai; ISBN 7-5326-0596-5; OCLC 917561169
- Banking in Modern China: Entrepreneurs, Professional Managers, and the Development of Chinese Banks, 1897–1937; Cheng, Linsun, 2003; Cambridge University Press: Cambridge; ISBN 0-521-81142-2; OCLC 743335656
- Chinese Capitalists in Japan's New Order: the Occupied Lower Yangzi, 1937–1945; Coble, Jr., Parks M., 2003; University of California Press: Berkeley and Los Angeles; ISBN 0-520-23268-2; OCLC 50334090
- A History of Modern Shanghai Banking: The Rise and Decline of China's Financial Capitalism; Ji, Zhaojin, 2003; M. E. Sharpe, Inc.: Armonk; ISBN 0-7656-1002-7; OCLC 1202048708
- 戦前日本の高等商業学校における中国人留学生に関する研究 Senzen nihon no kōtō shōgyō gakkō ni okeru chūgokujin ryūgakusei ni kansuru kenkyū; Ran Ō 王嵐, 2004; 学文社, Gakubunsha: Tōkyō; ISBN 4-7620-1283-1; OCLC 676108780
- 艰难的辉煌 : 中信30年之路 Jian nan de hui huang : Zhong xin 30 nian zhi lu; Wang Weiqun 王伟群, 2010; Zhong xin chu ban she: Beijing; ISBN 9787508621487; OCLC 730151265.
- 溯源循脉 Su yuan xun mai; Wu Zhaozheng 吴兆正, Wu Zhaoli 吴兆立, Wu Zhaoshen 吴兆申 and Wu Zhaoyu 吴兆玉, 2012; privately published.
