= Sze =

Sze or SZE may refer to:

== People ==
- Alfred Sao-ke Sze (1877–1958), Chinese diplomat
- Arthur Sze (born 1950, American poet
- Chris Sze (born 2003), English footballer
- David Sze (born 1966), American businessman
- Gillian Sze, Canadian writer
- Julie Sze, American professor of American studies
- Kristen Sze, American journalist
- Mai-Mai Sze (1909–1992), Chinese-American painter and writer
- Melody Sze, Hong Kong mezzo-soprano singer
- Michael Sze (1945–2022), Hong Kong government official
- Rudolph Sze (c. 1890–1938), Chinese chess master
- Sarah Sze (born 1969), American artist
- Simon Sze (born 1936), electrical engineer, professor
- Sze Flett, Australian scientist
- Sze Hang-yu (born 1988), Hong Kong swimmer
- Sze Hong Chew (1959–2023), Singaporean television news presenter
- Sze Kin Wai (born 1984), Hong Kong footballer
- Sze Tak-loy (born 1982) Hong Kong politician
- Sze Tsung Leong (born 1970), American and British photographer and artist
- Sze Yu (born 1962), Chinese-born Australian badminton player, television presenter and actor
- Szeming Sze (1908–1998), Chinese diplomat
- Vivienne Sze, American electrical engineer and computer scientist
- Wilbur C. Sze, (1915–2009), Chinese-American Marine Corps officer
- Yeng Sze (born 1946), Hong Kong competitive body builder, martial artist and actor better known as Bolo Yeung
- Yi-Kwei Sze (1915–1994), Chinese-born American bass-baritone

For the Cantonese surname, see also:

- Shī (施)
- Shǐ (史)

== Other uses ==
- Semera Airport, Ethiopia (IATA code: SZE)
- Széchenyi István University, Hungary
