= Bank of Shanghai =

State-owned commercial bank in Shanghai, China

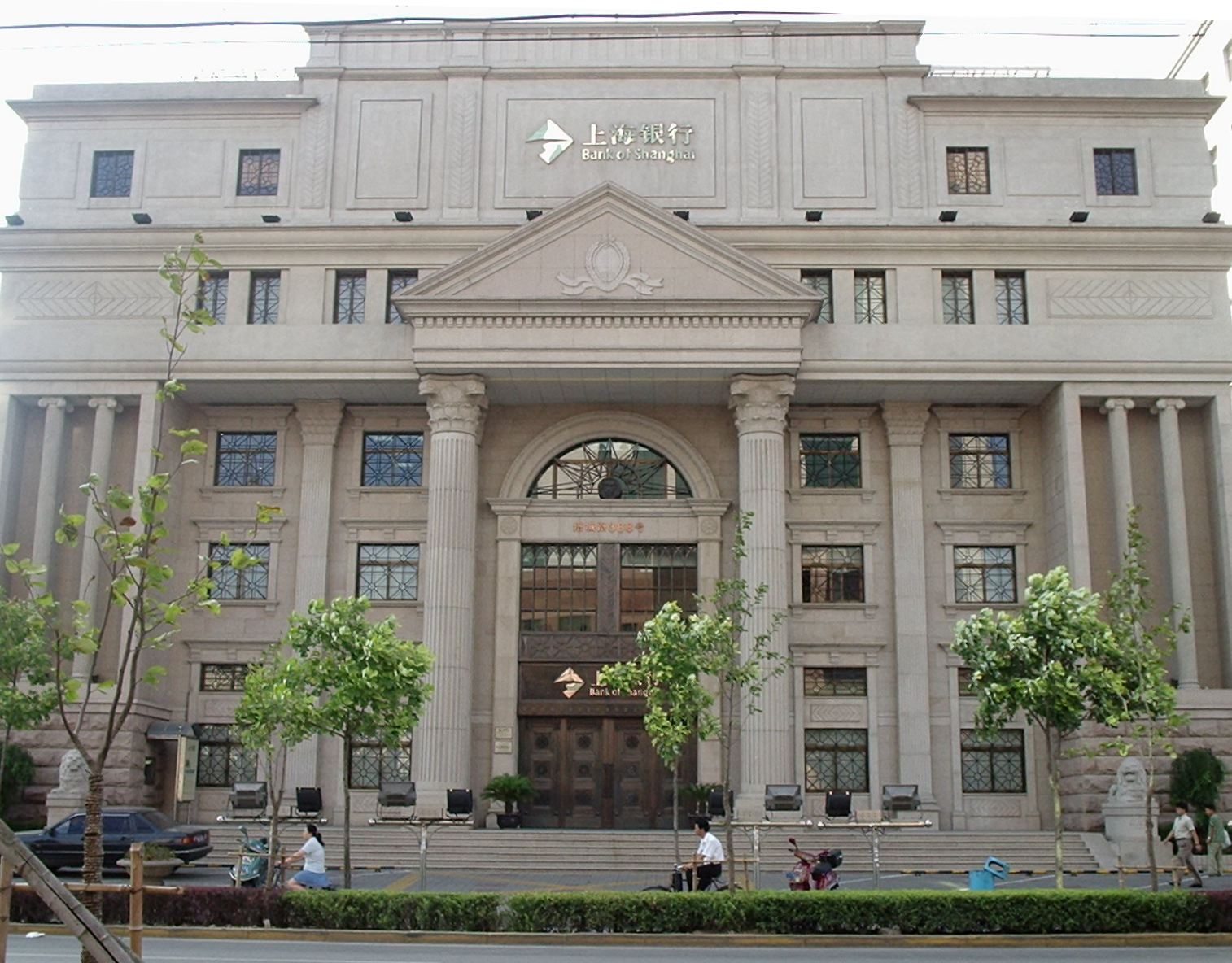
- The Bank of Shanghai building in the Jiading district of Shanghai
- Type: Public
- Traded as: SSE: 601229; SSE 50 Component
- Industry: Financial services
- Founded: 30 January 1996
- Headquarters: Shanghai, China
- Services: Retail and corporate banking
- Revenue: ▲CNY¥33.16 billion (US$5.14 billion) (2015)
- Operating income: ▲CNY¥15.92 billion (US$2.47 billion) (2015)
- Net income: ▲CNY¥13 billion (US$2.02 billion) (2015)
- Total assets: ▲CNY¥1.45 trillion (US$224.81 billion) (2015)
- Total equity: ▲CNY¥92.83 billion (US$14.39 billion) (2015)
- Owner: Shanghai Government (26.64%); Central People's Government (12.11%); Banco Santander (7.20%); TCL Corporation (3.73%); Shanghai Commercial Bank (3.00%); others (47.33%)
- Capital ratio: 10.32% (CET1)
- Footnotes in a consolidated basis; please see the report for their definition of revenue, operating income in Chinese accounting standards

Bank of Shanghai Co., Ltd.
- Simplified Chinese: 上海银行股份有限公司
- Traditional Chinese: 上海銀行股份有限公司
- Literal meaning: Shanghai Bank Joint-Stock Limited Company
Transcriptions

Bank of Shanghai
- Simplified Chinese: 上海银行
- Traditional Chinese: 上海銀行
Transcriptions
Standard Mandarin
- Hanyu Pinyin: Shànghǎi Yínháng

Bank of Shanghai Co., Ltd. (BOSC) is an urban commercial bank based in Shanghai in China. The bank was ranked 73rd among 1000 banks around the world by The Banker in terms of their Tier 1 capital in 2020.

== History ==
The Bank of Shanghai was founded on January 30, 1996, as the Shanghai City Cooperative Bank, by the merger of 98 City Cooperative Credit Unions of Shanghai, together with the Joint Union of the Shanghai City Cooperative Credit Unions. The company resolved to change its name to the "Bank of Shanghai" in 1998, and regulatory registration of the new name was completed in 2000. Headquartered in Shanghai, China, it is a listed company on the main board of the Shanghai Stock Exchange with stock code 601229. In September 1999 and December 2001, Bank of Shanghai received equity investments from International Finance Corporation of the World Bank Group, The Hong Kong and Shanghai Banking Corporation (HSBC) and The Shanghai Commercial Bank of Hong Kong. Prior to 1949, Shanghai was the main branch of HSBC, but its operations in mainland China had significantly scaled down in the 1950s. The Shanghai Commercial Bank was also based in Shanghai before the establishment of the People's Republic of China in 1949, but its mainland operations were nationalized in 1950.

On 11 December 2013, HSBC Hong Kong sold their 8.0% stake of the Bank of Shanghai to Spanish multinational banking group Banco Santander for an undisclosed fee (Santander announced that including the cooperation agreement, the total investment would be €470 million), which HSBC HK listed the stake as an available-for-sale asset with a fair value of HK$3.629 billion (approx. US$468 million) in the balance sheet at 30 September 2013. It was HSBC's successive disinvestment in the mainland China after selling Ping An Insurance in December 2012.

In 2016, the Bank of Shanghai applied the clearance for IPO. Since June 2017, it was part of Shanghai Stock Exchange's blue chip index: SSE 50 Index.

== Shareholder ==
As of 31 December 2015
Major Shareholders

- Subsidiaries and wholly owned subsidiaries of Shanghai Municipal People's Government and district-level governments
  - Shanghai Alliance Investment (15.08%)
  - Shanghai International Port Group (7.20%)
  - Shanghai Huixin (2.16%)
  - Shanghai Huangpu District State-Owned Assets Corporation (2.20%)
- Companies under the supervision of the State Council (SASAC and the Ministry of Finance)
  - China Jianyin Investment (5.48%)
  - China Shipbuilding & Offshore International of China Shipbuilding Industry Corporation (4.63%)
  - CITIC Guoan of CITIC Guoan Group (2.00%)
- Banco Santander (7.20%)
- TCL Corporation (3.73%)
- Shanghai Commercial Bank (3.00%)

According to the bank, 206 Chinese state-owned enterprises owned 56% stake of the share capital in total, as at 31 July 2015.

== See also ==
- Chen Guangfu, founder
  - Shanghai Commercial and Savings Bank (Taiwan)
  - Shanghai Commercial Bank (Hong Kong)
