= Shanghai Commercial Bank =

Bank based in Hong Kong

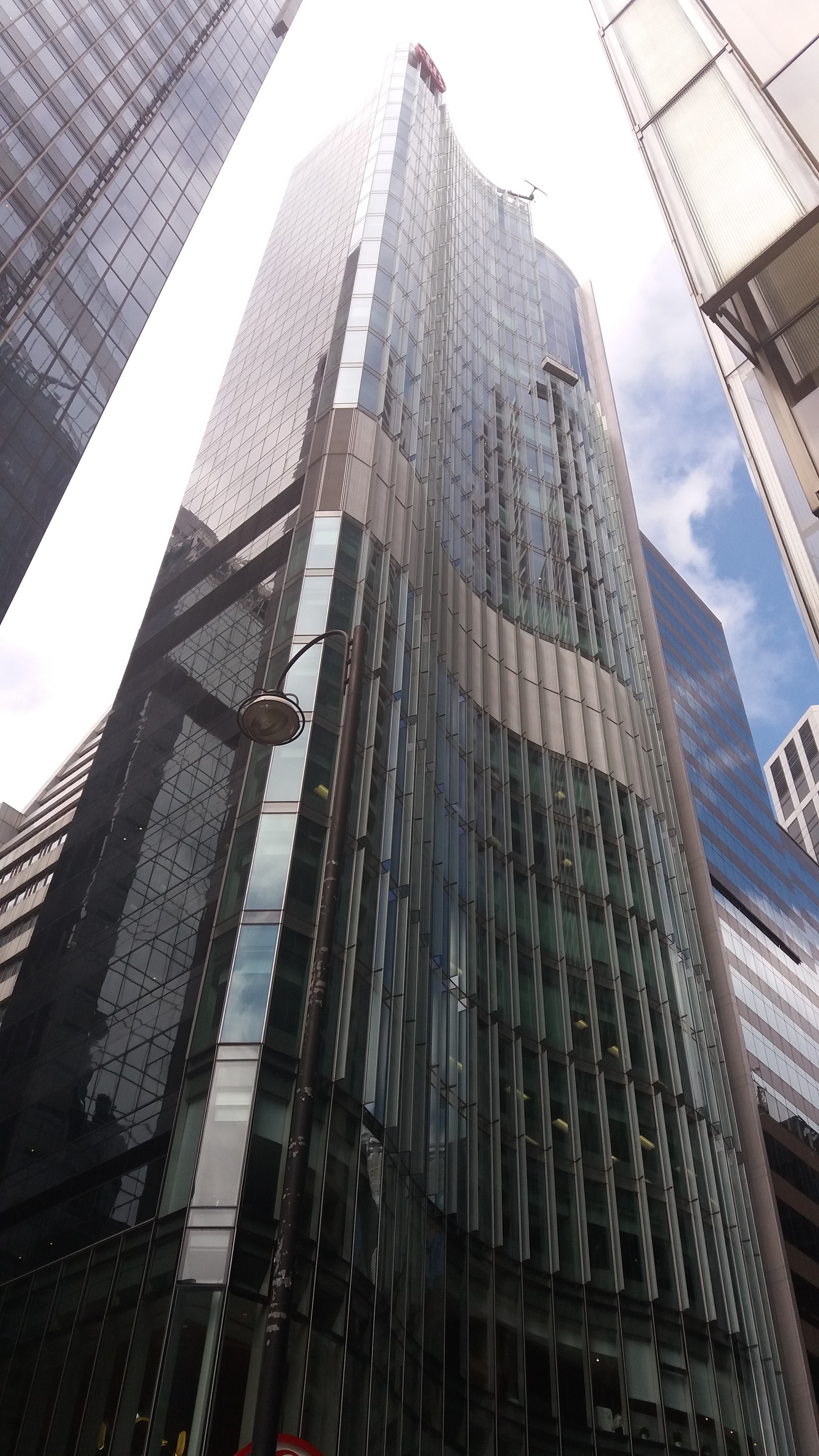
- Headquarters at Shanghai Commercial Bank Tower in Central
- Native name: 上海商業銀行
- Type: Private
- Industry: Financial services
- Founded: November 1950; 76 years ago
- Headquarters: Shanghai Commercial Bank Building, 12 Queen's Road Central, Central, Hong Kong
- Parent: Shanghai Commercial and Savings Bank
- Website: www.shacombank.com.hk

The Shanghai Commercial Bank (ShanCom; Chinese: 上海商業銀行) is an international bank based in Hong Kong. Its subsidiary companies offer banking and financial services across the world, but mainly in China. The bank was founded by Kwang Pu Chen in 1915.

As a group, it employs over 1,790 people. The bank is a financial institution incorporated in Hong Kong. The address of its registered headquarters is 12 Queen's Road Central, Central, Hong Kong.

== History ==
Historically, the Shanghai Commercial Bank was founded in Shanghai in 1915 under the leadership of K.P. Chen (1881–1976), a graduate of the University of Pennsylvania's Wharton School of Finance. In 1927, the Shanghai Commercial Bank established a travel service division, which later became the independent China Travel Service. The bank expanded in the late 1920s and early 1930s, endured the period of Japanese aggression, but suffered significant set-backs during the Chinese Civil War.

In 1950, with the new Communist government intent on nationalising the banking industry in mainland China, the Hong Kong branch of the Shanghai Commercial Bank was separately incorporated in Hong Kong as the Shanghai Commercial Bank. The bank's assets in mainland China were compulsorily acquired by the government. In 1954, the bank was permitted to re-register in Taiwan as the Shanghai Commercial and Savings Bank (SCSB), retaining a majority shareholding in the Hong Kong bank. Both parts of the bank, in Hong Kong and Taiwan, rebuilt themselves from the 1960s-1980s as both economies prospered.

In 1995, the Shanghai City Credit Union in mainland China was converted to a bank, the Shanghai City Cooperative Bank, which was subsequently renamed the Bank of Shanghai. The SCB has acquired a 3% stake in the Bank of Shanghai, symbolically re-establishing its link to banking in Shanghai.

In 2011, the three "Banks of Shanghai" entered into a cooperation agreement. The link between the three banks is emphasised in some marketing materials, with the slogan "Bank of Shanghai in 3 regions on both sides of the Strait".

== Headquarter Building ==
In 2008, SCB bought the CNAC Group building at 10 Queen's Road Central, adjacent to its then headquarters building for further expansion. The purchase of CNAC building costed HK$1.388 billion for gross area of 70,00 square feet, and SCB intended to invest another 500 to 600 HKD Million to redevelop it along with the building at 12 Queen's Road Central as the new headquarters tower. The expected gross space will increase to 140,000 square feet.

The new tower opened in September 2016 including opening of its flagship retail branch at the basement of the tower.

== Services ==
The Shanghai Commercial Bank offers corporate and retail banking services and products including deposits, loans, remittances, foreign exchange, trade finance, securities trading, wealth management services, credit cards, and insurance, amongst others. The bank also offers telephone banking and electronic banking services as a fast and convenient means to serve individual and corporate clients respectively. Moreover, the bank has been issuing floating rate certificates of deposit which were well received by the market since early 1994.

== Branches ==
At present, Shanghai Commercial Bank has over 50 branches across Hong Kong, mainland China, United Kingdom and United States.

=== United Kingdom ===
There is one branch setup in London since 1980 providing banking services to individuals living in UK and companies incorporated in UK or outside UK.

=== United States ===
There are 3 branches in the following cities: They provide banking services to individuals living in US and to companies incorporated in US or outside US, and have commenced the services since 1973.

- New York
- San Francisco
- Los Angeles

== Financial Position and Strategic Outlook ==
=== 2009 Financial Position and 2010 Outlook ===
The consolidated profit attributable to shareholders, in 2009, was HK$1,336 million, representing a gain of 12.7 percent. The increase was primarily due to the substantially lower impairment allowances, positive contributions from all the jointly controlled entities, improved fee income from securities related business and treasury operation. The return on average total assets and return on average equity stood at 1.2 percent and 8.7 percent respectively. Capital adequacy ratio remained strong at 19 percent, while the liquidity ratio was 55 percent. The additional compensation made for the Lehman Brothers Minibonds Repurchase Scheme had a negative impact on the bank's cost-to-income ratio and it increased to 43.7 percent. Excluding the additional compensation, the ratio would have been 34.9 percent; in 2008, it was 34.3 percent.

The bank is obtaining the necessary approval to upgrade the Shanghai representative office to full branch status. Also, the bank is committed to the “Green Channel”, a convenient one-stop platform of premium banking services in the Greater China region, for the VIP customers of the three banks: Shanghai Commercial Bank in Hong Kong, Bank of Shanghai on mainland China and The Shanghai Commercial & Savings Bank in Taiwan. The redevelopment project of the Head Office building, together with the adjacent plot, is proceeding on course. The bank has engaged the award-winning Rocco Design Architects Limited as the project's architectural firm. The general building plan is expected to be finalised some time in 2010 and demolition of the current structures will commence in mid-2011.

=== 2016 ===
SCB announced its result for 2016 on April 26, 2017. Profit after tax was HKD 1,913.0 million against HKD 1,902.3 million a year ago, representing an increase of HKD 10.7 million or 0.56%.

=== 2017 ===
SCB issued an international bond of US$250 million with 10 year tenor in November 2017, maturing 2027. The bond proceeds was used to strengthen SCB's capital base and to fund future business growth. Credit agency Fitch has given a BBB+ rating to this bond.

In April 2018, SCB announced its financial results for 2017 with a consolidated profit after tax of HKD 2,430 million, an increase of 27.1% or HKD 518 million from previous year.

== JETCO ==
SCB was one of the founding banks of JETCO, the Joint Electronic Tellers Services Limited Network back in 1982. The other founding banks were Hong Kong Branch of the Bank of China (now Bank of China (Hong Kong)), the Bank of East Asia, Chekiang First Bank and Wing Lung Bank. JETCO is a peer competitor to another ATM network formed by HSBC and Hang Seng Bank.

== Digital Initiatives ==
In December 2015, SCB started using behavioral analytics solution to enhance its digital banking strategy to facilitate an O2O (online-to-offline) operating model. This technology was expected to allow SCB to gain a better understanding of its consumer banking and SME customers, and to create more personalized e-Banking services and marketing campaigns.

== See also ==
- Chen Guangfu, founder
  - Shanghai Commercial and Savings Bank (Taiwan)
  - Bank of Shanghai (Mainland China)
