= JETCO =

JETCO 銀通
- Operating area: Hong Kong and Macau
- Members: 34
- ATMs: Around 3,000
- Founded: 1982
- Website: www.jetco.com.hk

JETCO (Chinese: 銀通), officially Joint Electronic Teller Services Limited (Chinese: 銀聯通寶有限公司) is a network of automatic teller machines in Hong Kong and Macau.

== History ==
JETCO was founded by the Hong Kong Branch of the Bank of China (now Bank of China (Hong Kong)) in 1982 along with the Bank of East Asia, Chekiang First Bank, Shanghai Commercial Bank and Wing Lung Bank, and at present covers all banks in Hong Kong and Macau, except for HSBC and Hang Seng Bank, which uses a separate system known as ETC (易通財).

== See also ==
- ATM usage fees
