= Chen Guangfu =

Chen Guangfu may refer to:

- Kwang Pu Chen (1880–1976), Chinese banker
- Chen Kuang-fu (born 1955), Taiwanese politician
