= Maeching Li Kao =

American social worker

- 高李梅卿
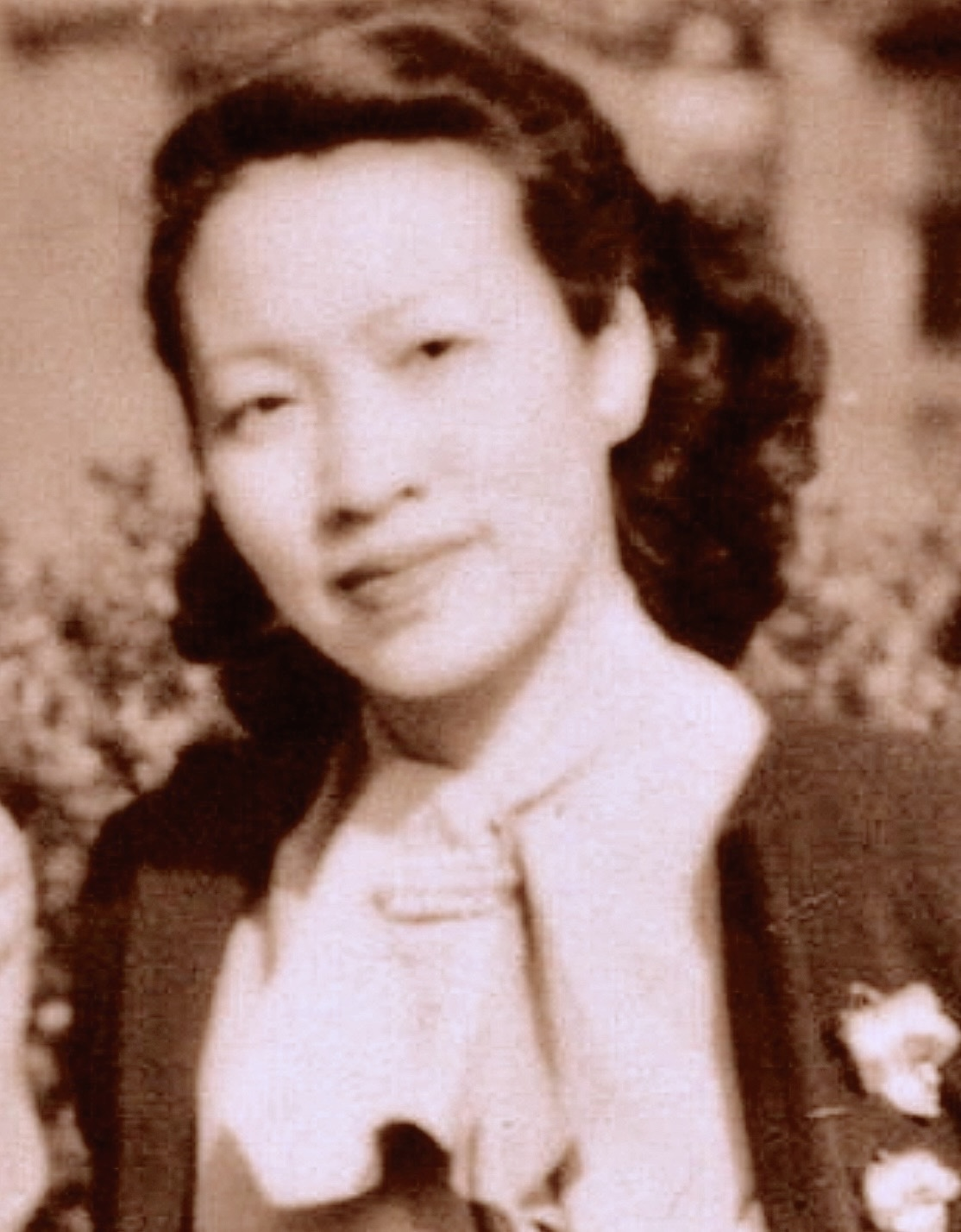
- Born: Li Maeching 李梅卿; February 20, 1920; Shanghai, China
- Died: July 25, 2003 (aged 83); Winter Park, Florida, U.S.
- Occupation: Social worker
- Spouse: George Kao (m. 1946)
- Relatives: Szeming Sze (brother-in-law)

Maeching Li Kao (Chinese: 高李梅卿; pinyin: Gāo Lǐ Méiqīng; February 20, 1920 – July 25, 2003) was a Chinese-born American social worker and philanthropist, and wife of writer, editor, and translator George Kao.

== Early life and education ==
Li Maeching was born in Shanghai, the daughter of banker Li Ming. She attended St. Mary's Hall and St. John's University in Shanghai and Wellesley College, before graduating from Barnard College in 1944. She wrote "A Spool of Thread", "an authentic story of the effect of the Chinese War on a Shanghai university student", for the Winter 1943 issue of Barnard Quarterly. She also participated in fundraising events for United China Relief.

Kao earned a Master of Social Work degree in 1964, from Catholic University of America. Her master's thesis was titled "A Study of Eight Mothers who Were Readmitted to St. Elizabeths Hospital and Their Children who Were in Care with Child Welfare Division".

Her older sister Bessie Li was a pianist before she married diplomat Szeming Sze.

== Career ==
During World War II and after, Li was on the staff of the China Institute, assisting Chinese students who were unable to return home during wartime. In 1963, during graduate school, she worked part time at the Community Psychiatric Clinic in Bethesda, Maryland. Later in life, she was an adoption specialist at the Montgomery County Department of Social Services in Maryland. In 1984, she wrote and published a cookbook on making Chinese food with a microwave oven. Her husband's work meant that she lived in Carmel, California, Washington, D.C. and Hong Kong during her adult life, before retiring to Florida.

== Personal life and legacy ==
Maeching Li married writer, translator, and editor George Kao in 1946; they had two sons, William and Jeffrey. Kao became a United States citizen in 1951.

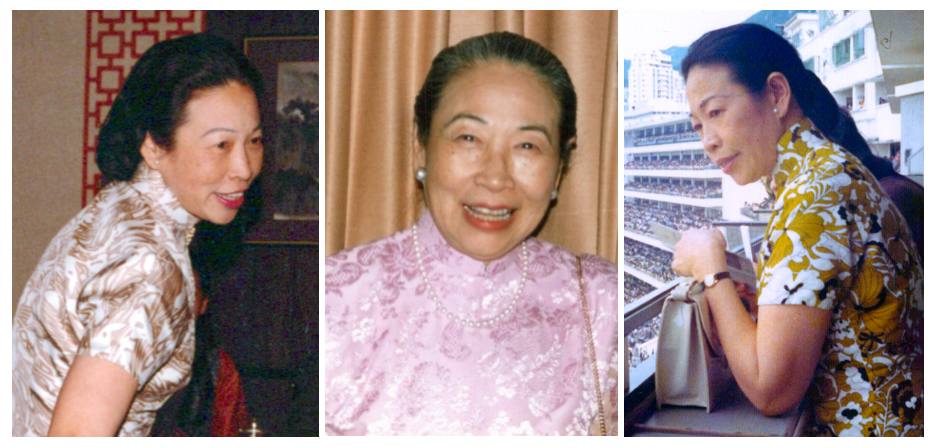
Three Styles of Qipao

Among her personal acquaintances and social circles, Maeching was well-known for her fondness for the traditional Chinese qipao, for which she favored simple yet elegant and refined patterns.

She died from leukemia in 2003, aged 83 years, in Winter Park, Florida. Rollins College in Florida has a Maeching Li and George Kao Fund for Chinese Studies, assisting students and faculty to travel to China, and a George and Maeching Kao Chinese Language Award.
