= Shorter than the Day =

2020 artwork

- Artist: Sarah Sze
- Year: 2020
- Weight: 5 tons

Shorter than the Day is a 2020 art installation by Sarah Sze which overhangs LaGuardia Airport Terminal B's baggage claim. The spherical structure is built from a network of suspended rods and 900 photographs of the New York sky shot from dawn to dusk. She was partly inspired by the Grand Central Terminal clock. At the time of her work's unveiling, she called it her most complex sculpture.

== Description ==
The installation artist Sarah Sze designed Shorter than the Day as a spherical constellation of suspended rods. Around its edges are 900 photographs of the New York sky shot from dawn to dusk. As the Earth revolves around the sun, by walking the perimeter of the work, the viewer sees the sky shift from day to night.

The sculpture hangs in LaGuardia Airport Terminal B, where it starts on the departures level atrium and passes through an opening in the floor into the baggage claim level. It is titled in reference to Emily Dickenson's poem, "Because I could not stop for Death".

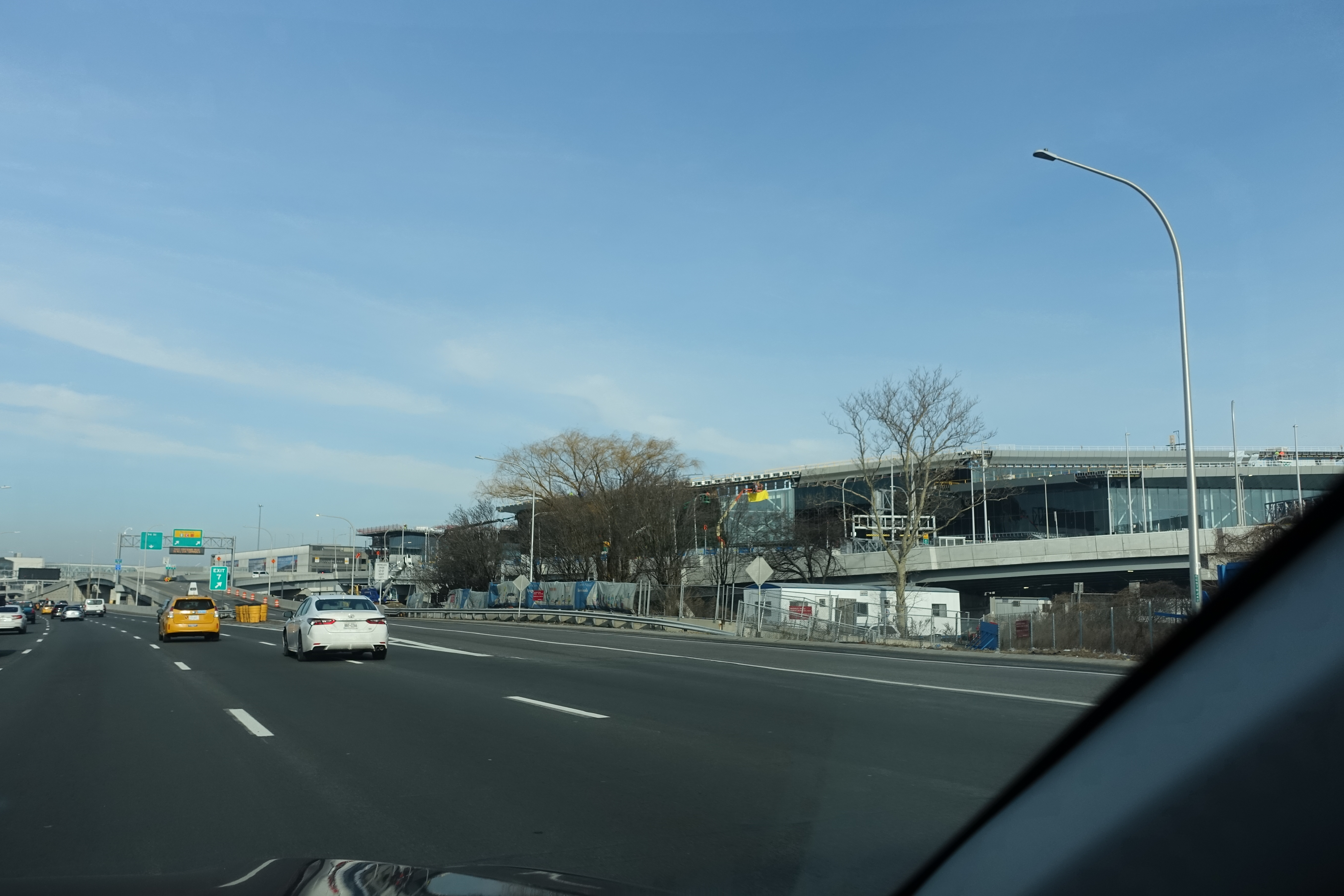
Image of La Guardia Airport in New York City

== Production ==
LaGuardia Gateway Partners and the Public Art Fund commissioned Shorter than the Day. The intent was to create site-specific pieces that would integrate into the terminal’s architectural structure by hiring artists of international backgrounds– Sze being one of them. The terminal’s open design, denoted by fluid spaces and abundant natural light, presented an avenue for the artists to respond to and incorporate these architectural features into their installations. Sara Sze’s Shorter than the Day distinguishes itself through its perceived buoyancy- despite being made of metal and suspended from the ceiling.

Diagram of La Guardia Airport

Sze wanted the installation to be "almost like a mirage", ethereal and fragile, while capturing the "feeling of shifting time and place" that goes with air travel. The sculpture was fabricated by Amuneal, based in Philadelphia. Sze, a New York-based artist, was in the city during the COVID-19 pandemic lockdown and so continued her work on the sculpture with her team during that time. The printed photographs are connected to the aluminum and steel rods with alligator clips. The work weighs five tons.

At the time of the sculpture's unveiling, on June 11, 2020, Sze considered the work her most complex yet. The work was unveiled along that of three other artists in the terminal. She was also inspired by the definitional Grand Central Terminal clock.

In both form and content, the work aligns with the vision of a “lightness in being”, adapting to the monumental scale of the terminal and creating pieces that appear to float, consequently animating the space in unexpected ways. Sze’s work engages with New York’s built and natural environments, cultural identity, and the historical context of the airport itself. In doing so, Sze provides art that is beyond a visual experience; one that is also a form of public pedagogy, encouraging curiosity and interaction with the space, the city, and the internal reflection of the passengers who pass through it. By occupying space in an overtly public way, Sze’s work underscores the role of site-specific public art as activating spaces by which it occupies to engage in its historical and material discourse.

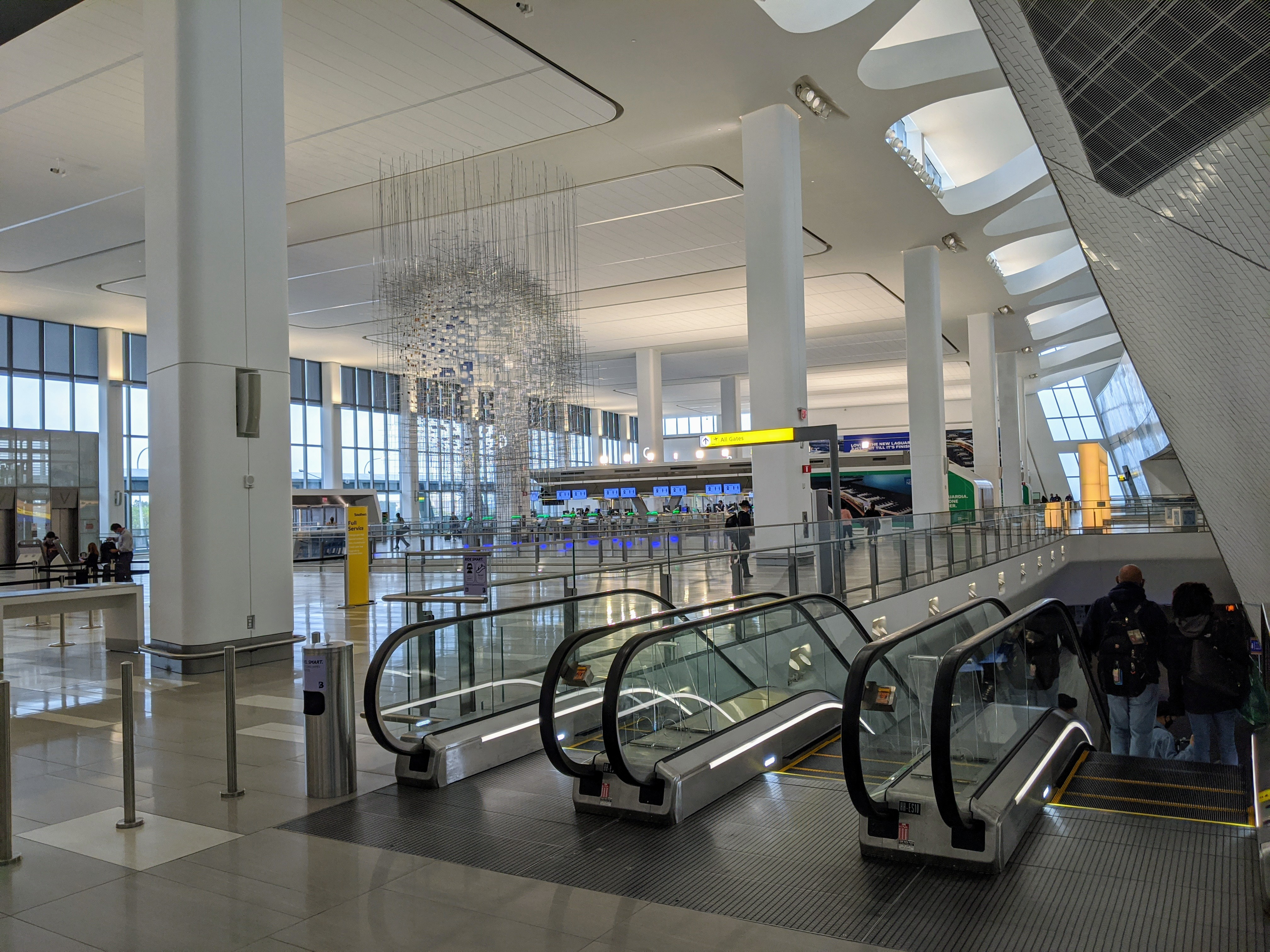
Image of Sarah Sze's Shorter than the Day in Terminal B at the La Guardia Airport

== Influences on Sze's subsequent works ==
Since the beginning of her practice in the late 1990s, Sze has engaged with different types of media to explore the confluence of information, technology, materiality, and time. Sze’s exploration aligns with ideas found in Media Art and the Resurrection of an Image: Motion and Sculpturing. Her sculptures, which are assemblages of everyday objects, teeter on the verge of transformation, mirroring the process of constructed photographs. Shorter Than the Day merges the ephemeral with the permanent; deckle-edged photographs and numbered yellow tape fragments are durable, powder-coated metal replicas, reflecting both the fluidity of time and the work’s creation. Instead of merely staging an image, Sze manipulates the physical elements themselves, akin to the interventions of early photographic experiments, like those seen in the combination printing of The Two Ways of Life by Oscar Rejlander. This sculpture depicts the passage of time through hundreds of photographs of the New York City sky, capturing the cycle from dawn to midnight. Sze’s globe-like structure reveals more as viewers move around it, symbolizing the fragility of both time and Earth. Shorter Than the Day meditates on permanence and transience, embodying the essence of Emily Dickinson’s poem, “We passed the Setting Sun / Or rather – He passed us.

Building on her exploration of time, perception, and materiality, Sze produced another work in 2024 entitled, “Pictures at an Exhibition” which draws inspiration from Modest Mussorgsky’s 1874 piano suite, which interprets a sequence of paintings. Much like the suite’s orchestral movements, Sze’s installation connects media, perceptions, and sensory experiences, incorporating natural imagery with abstract forms. Through rapid transitions between fragmented and whole images, the work creates constellations of larger cohesive shapes, representing a collection of fleeting moments that span the personal, the universal, the momentous, and the mundane.

The constantly evolving imagery speaks to the transient nature of digital representation and the shifts in memory, perception, and desire. In this exhibition, Sze’s installation is complemented by a new series of paintings, where she applies her visual language across the gallery spaces. Using a generative process, she layers acrylic, oil, and photographic prints onto the canvases, creating disorienting compositions that blur the lines between digital and analog, tactile and immaterial, and physical and imagined. Sze’s work explores the relationship between image-making and physical construction, balancing stillness with movement and order with chaos while maintaining an organic, kinetic quality.
