= Renditions (magazine) =

English-language Chinese literature literary magazine

- Categories: Chinese literature
- Frequency: Biannual
- Publisher: Research Centre for Translation, The Chinese University of Hong Kong
- Founded: 1973-20
- Country: Hong Kong
- Website: rct.cuhk.edu.hk/renditions/publications/renditions-journal/
- ISSN: 0377-3515

Renditions
- Traditional Chinese: 譯叢
- Simplified Chinese: 译丛
Transcriptions
Standard Mandarin
- Hanyu Pinyin: Yì Cóng
Yue: Cantonese
- Yale Romanization: Yihk Chùhng
- Jyutping: jik6 cung4

Renditions: A Chinese-English Translation Magazine (Chinese: 譯叢) is a literary magazine on Chinese literature in English translation published by the Research Centre for Translation (RCT) at the Chinese University of Hong Kong. It was established in 1973 and covers Chinese literature, from classical works of poetry, prose, and fiction to their contemporary counterparts, as well as articles on art, Chinese studies, and translation studies. Renditions was published twice a year, in May and in November. It ceased publication in 2024, after 100 issues.

== History ==
Renditions was established by Chinese American translator George Kao who was a visiting senior fellow at RCT and contributed a number of translations to the journal himself.

== Special issues ==
Special issues include one on women's writing (issues 27 & 28, 1987) by writers from China, Taiwan, and Hong Kong; the first anthology of Hong Kong literature in any language (issues 29 & 30, 1988); Chinese Impressions of the West (issues 53 & 54, 2000), which presents the experience and observations of those who journeyed to the West in the 19th century, as well as the impressions and opinions of those who had never been outside China; and poems, plays, stories and paintings about Wang Zhaojun (issues 59 & 60, 2003), a Han court lady and celebrated beauty who married a Xiongnu chieftain in 33 BCE.

== Other publications ==
Included under the Renditions umbrella are other publications: a hard-cover and a paperback series. The hard-cover series was introduced in 1976, primarily for the library market in recognition of a core readership in the discipline of Chinese Studies in English-speaking countries. A paperback series was launched in 1986 to make high-quality translations available to a wider market. A special product introduced in 2002 is the Renditions personal digital assistant series, sold directly on-line, featuring poetry selections and city stories especially chosen for readers interested in China or travelling to Asia. Out-of-print issues of Renditions journal and titles from the Renditions paperback series are available on CD-ROM.

== Online database ==
An online database that is searchable by author, translator, keyword and genre, indexing all translations published in Renditions and the paperback and hard-cover series can be accessed on the Renditions website. Since January 2007, the database also includes Chinese characters for titles and authors of all listed works.
