= Shanghai Commercial and Savings Bank =

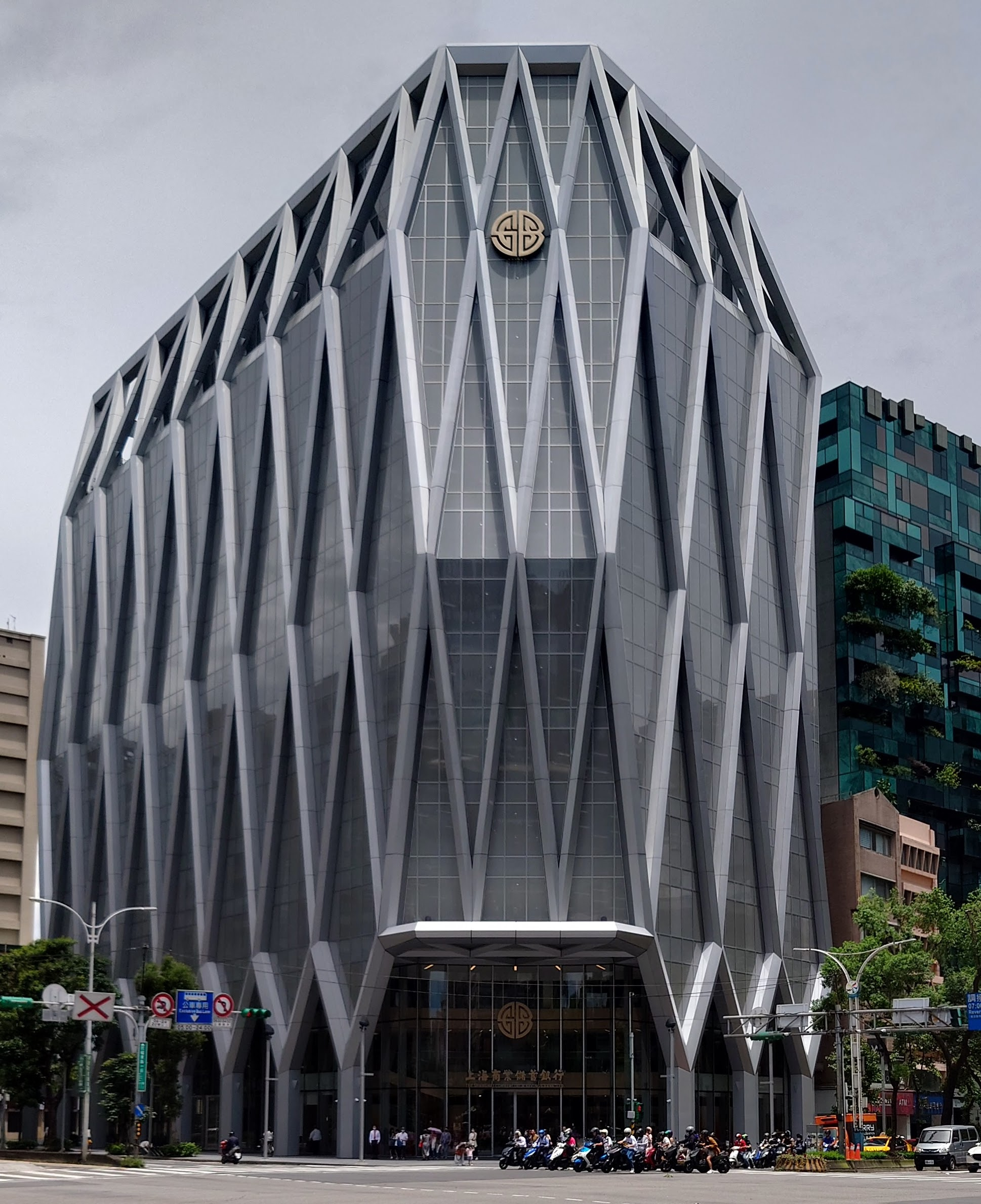
- Head office at Shanghai Bank Tower in Taipei under construction
- Native name: 上海商業儲蓄銀行
- Type: Privately owned company
- Traded as: TWSE: 5876
- Industry: Bank
- Founded: 1964
- Founder: Chen Guangfu
- Headquarters: Taipei, Taiwan
- Products: Financial services
- Website: http://www.scsb.com.tw/econtent/index.jsp

The Shanghai Commercial and Savings Bank (simplified Chinese: 上海商业储蓄银行; traditional Chinese: 上海商業儲蓄銀行; pinyin: Shànghǎi Shāngyè Chúxù Yínháng) is a bank headquartered in Taipei, Taiwan.

== History ==
In 1954, the bank was allowed to establish its head office to prepare for the operation of business.

It was not until June 1965 that the bank was approved to start its operation in Taiwan with a capital of NT$15 million. Chen was the chairman, and the bank acted conservatively.

The Savings Department and Kaohsiung Branch were set up in 1966 and 1971, respectively.

== See also ==
- List of companies of Taiwan
- List of banks in Taiwan
- Chen Guangfu, founder
  - Shanghai Commercial Bank (Hong Kong)
  - Bank of Shanghai (China)

== Reading ==
- The Making of Modern Chinese Financial Entrepreneurship: The Case of Chen Guangfu by Pui-tak Lee, University of Hong Kong
- Personal papers of K. P. Chen deposited in the Rare Book and Manuscript Library, Columbia University,
- Recently published materials about K. P. Chen from China's archives
- The Shanghai Commercial & Savings Bank, Ltd
