= Kwang Pu Chen =

Shanghai-based Chinese banker

- 陳光甫
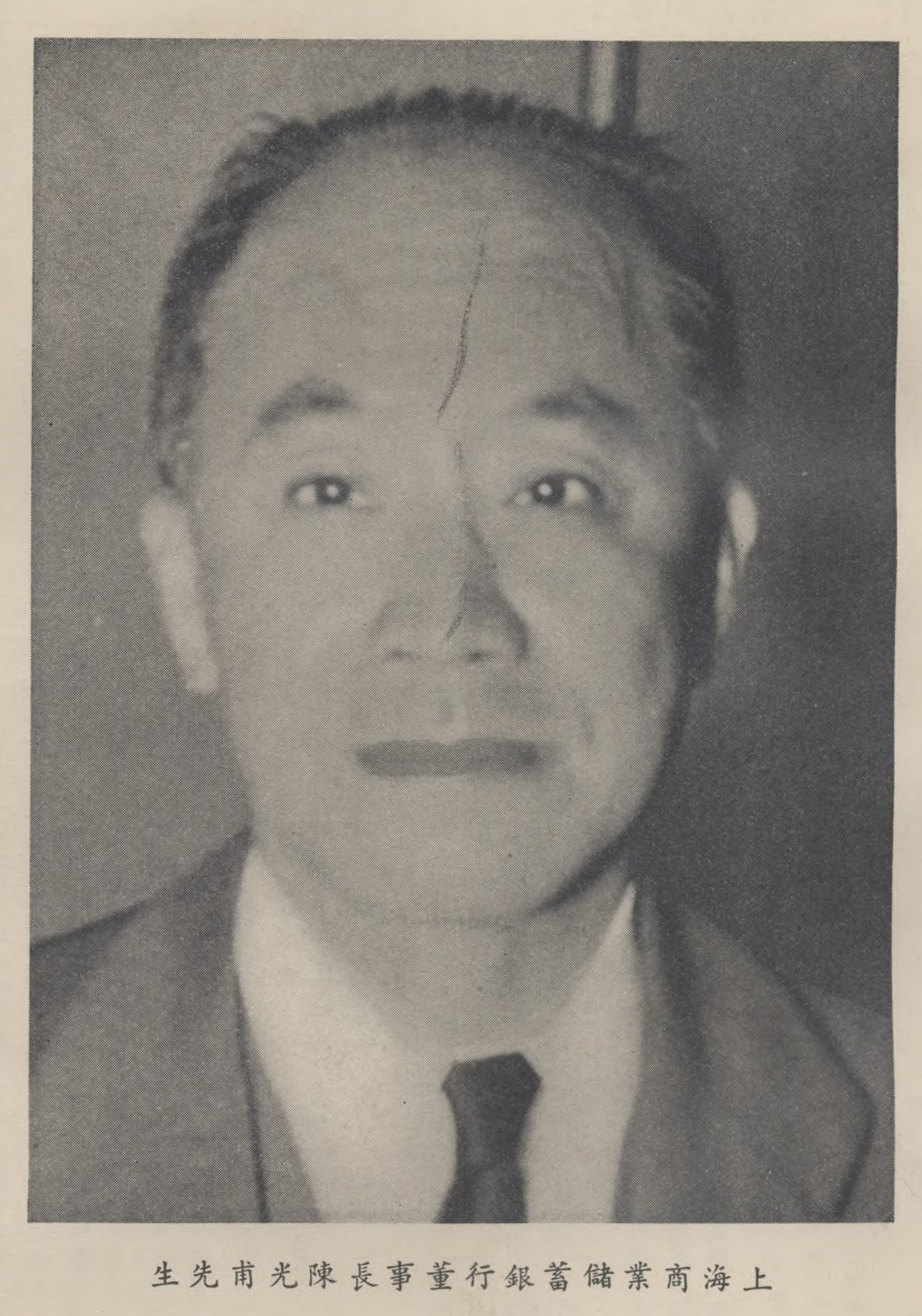

Member of the Legislative Yuan
- In office 1948–1951
- Constituency: Jiangsu

Personal details
- Born: 17 December 1881 Zhenjiang, Jiangsu, Qing China
- Died: 1 July 1976 (aged 94) Taipei, Taiwan
- Parent: Chen Zhongheng (陳仲衡) (father)
- Education: Simpson College; Ohio Wesleyan University; University of Pennsylvania (BS)
- Known for: Founder of Shanghai Commercial and Savings Bank; Founder of Shanghai Commercial Bank

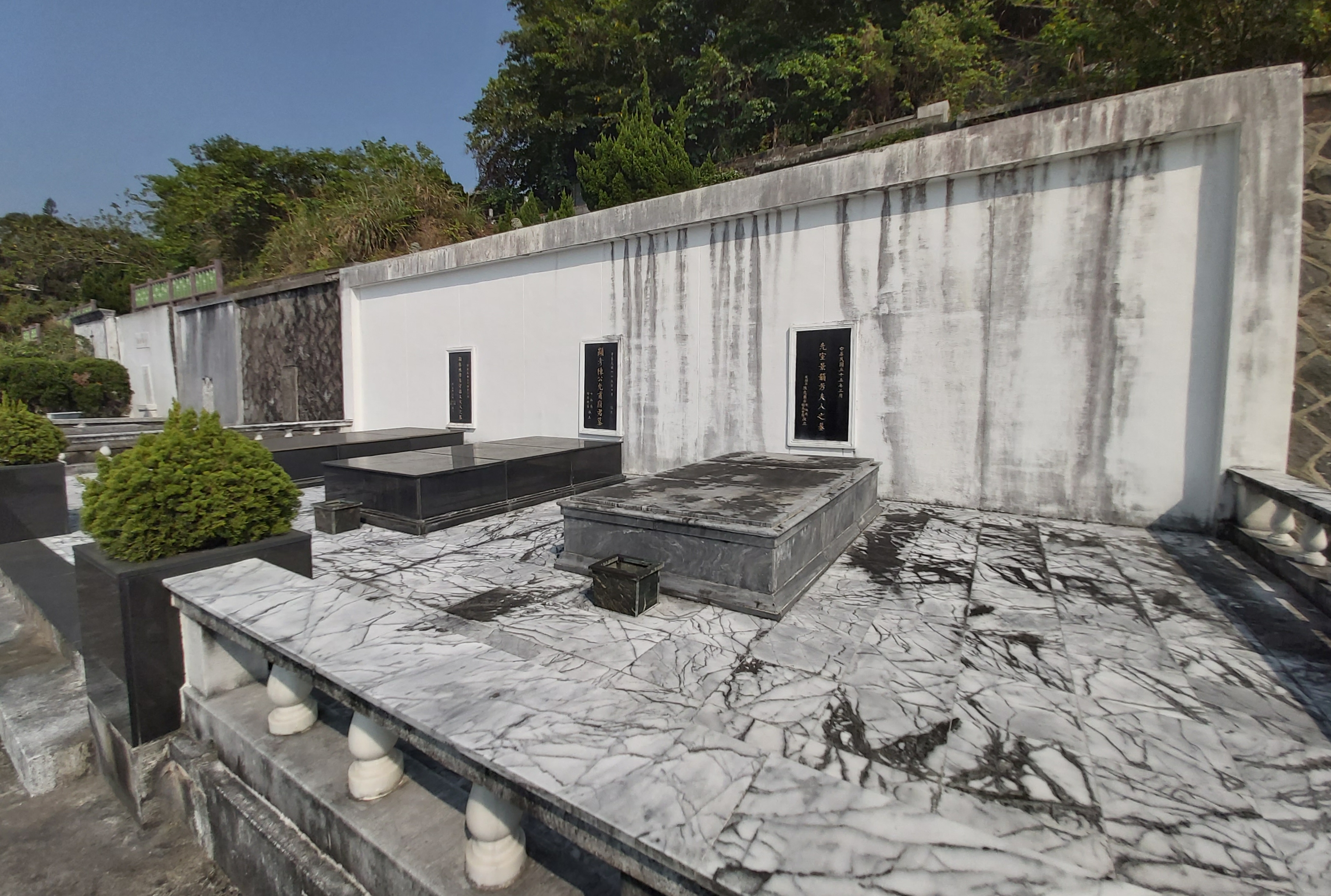
Tomb of Kwang Pu Chen in Yangmingshan Cemetery, Beitou District, Taipei.

Kwang Pu Chen (traditional Chinese: 陳光甫; simplified Chinese: 陈光甫; pinyin: Chén Guāngfǔ; Wade–Giles: Chen Kuang-fu; 17 December 1881 – 1 July 1976) was a Shanghai-based Chinese banker and State Councillor. He was the founder of the first modern Chinese savings bank, the Shanghai Commercial and Savings Bank, the Shanghai Commercial Bank, a travel agency, as well as the China Assurance Corporation Ltd.

He was one of China's most successful entrepreneurs in the twentieth century, particularly influential in the financial and business world of Shanghai. He played a key role in negotiating financial aid from the United States in 1937-1940, working with Treasury Secretary Henry Morgenthau.

Linsun Cheng, in his Banking in Modern China: Entrepreneurs, Professional Managers, and the Development of Chinese, says, "It is almost impossible to describe any significant innovation in the history of modern Chinese banks without mentioning K. P. Chen's name."

== Early life and education ==
In 1881, Chen was born in Zhenjiang, Jiangsu into a family with little education. He caught the attention of compradores of a foreign firm who decided to sponsor his education in the United States. He studied at Simpson College in Iowa and Ohio Wesleyan University before graduating with a Bachelor of Science (B.S.) degree in business from the Wharton School at the University of Pennsylvania.

After graduation, as part of the sponsorship agreement, he worked as an intern in an American bank for a year. He then returned to China where he joined the Nanyang Quanyehui or the Nanjing South Seas Exhibition, a China-hosted international exposition that showcased to the world both China’s modernization and cultural heritage.

== Career ==
=== The Jiangsu Bank ===
K. P. Chen began his China banking career in 1913, when he joined a provincial government bank, the Kiangsu Provincial Bank, as its General Manager. There, he introduced something new nearly every day, believing innovation necessary for success.

He broke with tradition and moved the bank's headquarters from Jiangsu to the banking capital of Shanghai, made loans on credit of goods rather than personal credit and invited Western accountants to regularly audit the bank's balance books.

The bank established warehouses for its commodities lending operations, the first to do so in China.

He did all this in just a year, after which he was forced to resign when he refused to disclose the names of the bank's customers to a local warlord.

=== The Shanghai Commercial & Savings Bank (The Shanghai Bank) ===
In Shanghai in June 1915, K. P. Chen, together with some others including Chinese Red Cross President Zhuang Dezhi, founded the Shanghai Commercial and Savings Bank. Chen was appointed the bank's first General Manager. Chen had 80,000 Yuan in initial capital to found the bank. Their initial capital was so small the bank became known as "the Little Shanghai Bank".

His guiding principle was “service to society, support for industry, and prosperity to enhance international trade” and he made sure that his staff must be very polite and patient with their clients, small depositors. In his address to his staff in Qingdao branch, he emphasized that they must appreciate their customers business—whether for one or 100 Chinese dollars—must do their best to give their customers convenience, and must be friendly to businessmen. He said “the customer’s psychology always favors a busy place,” because the sight of a busy firm will make people trust it and claimed that the aim of The Shanghai Bank was to serve society and not just make a profit. So, even though some services would not be profitable, they still had to be offered. Chen Guangfu xiansheng lüezhuan (The short biography of Chen Guangfu, Taipei: Shanghai shangye chuxu yinhang, 1977, p. 31).

Innovation seems to have come naturally to K. P. Chen. It did not stop with the Kiangsu Bank. At the Shanghai Bank, contrary to what other banks were doing at the time, he concentrated on attracting deposits from the public instead of notes issuance.

K. P. Chen was the first to introduce "one dollar" accounts, encouraging savings among individual members of the greater public and took the lead in introducing many different types of savings programs.

The Shanghai Commercial and Savings Bank's motto, very reflective of Chen's values, was "service to society, support for industry, and development of international trade."

In 1928 the Shanghai Bank handled over 6 million Yuan in foreign exchange and became the number one private bank handling foreign exchange in China. The Chartered Bank of India, Australia and China became upset because of The Shanghai Bank's efforts to promote their foreign exchange business, and decided to refuse The Shanghai Bank's foreign exchange contracts. In retaliation K. P. Chen refused to accept contracts from the Chartered Bank and made this known to the Shanghai banking community through The Shanghai Bankers Association and The Shanghai Foreign Bankers Association, whom he rallied to his cause. Eventually the Chartered Bank came to cooperate with the Shanghai Bank through the mediation of a third party.

In 1931 he created a special trust department in the bank initially to rent out safety deposit boxes but later on including insurance and real estate operations among other things.

He traveled all over China. In the 1930s K. P. Chen would go into the Chinese countryside and attempt to make small farmers "banking-conscious", as observed by a Chartered Bank manager who accompanied Chen on one of his stints. "Don't go to Sinkiang. It's a very hard trip—even dangerous. And when you come back, no one will believe what you find there." he once told a Time Inc.'s Nanjing correspondent, Frederick Gruin.

=== Travel Service Department of the Shanghai Commercial and Savings Bank ===
Chen experienced discriminatory treatment from an English clerk at an office of the Thomas Cook & Sons travel agency in Hong Kong. On returning to Shanghai he decided to establish a travel service department within his bank to compete with the foreign travel agencies. Chen and others frequently cited his experience with discriminatory treatment as the impetus for founding the travel agency.

Having made the necessary preparations he submitted a proposal to the Ministry of Communications under the Northern Warlords Government (1912–1927), asking for permission to establish a travel service department and to sell train tickets on a commission basis.

Whilst the proposal was vociferously opposed by the many foreigners occupying important positions in many Chinese railways build with foreign loans at the National Railway Through Transport Conference, it was finally adopted thanks to the support of General Director of Communications Ye Gongche and others. In 1923, the Travel Department of the Shanghai Commercial and Savings Bank, China's first modern travel agency, opened. It operated on a trial basis and opened only to those from "polite society" instead of to the wider populace, providing a comparatively limited business scope.

In 1927, the Shanghai Commercial and Savings Bank travel department was spun off into a separate company from the bank, China Travel Service. Although they were separate companies, the two continued to share significant connections through Chen's common ownership, the movement of personnel between the companies, and the bank's financial and organizational support to the travel agency.

With a total investment of US$50,000, the travel agency was separated from its parent company and had to take on the whole responsibility for its profit and loss from then on. Chen Xiangtao, once an official from the Shanghai Public Communications Bureau was assigned the post of general manager. In April 1928, it changed its name to China Travel Service (holdings) Co. Ltd. (abbreviated as CTS (holding)). The year 1931 was the heyday for the CTS, they won the right to deal in European train tickets for Chinese traveling overseas. In the same year CTS opened up more than 20 chain hostels around the country and its annual profits reached more than US$4 million.

From 1927-1937, CTS expanded to operate on a nation-wide level, growing along with the development of highways and railways during the Nanjing decade.

The CTS halted its travel service during the Second Sino-Japanese War (1937–45) but was unable to recover after the communist revolution in 1949. Along with the management of the Shanghai Commercial and Savings Bank, the CTS evacuated to Taiwan, but was unable to resume operations. It declared bankruptcy in Taipei in July 1954 and retreated from the arena, but its epoch-making contribution to the Chinese Tourism Industry is still dwelt upon with great relish.

The mainland assets of the CTS were seized by Chinese Communist Party authorities, and today its successor is one of the state-owned large-scale lead enterprises managed by the State-owned Assets Supervision and Administration Commission of the State Council. The core business of CTS (holdings) includes travel, industry invests (steel and iron), the related real estate development and distribution trade.

=== The Three Musketeers ===
K. P. Chen cultivated close relationships with Li Ming (founder and CEO of Chekiang Industrial Bank and Chairman of the Shanghai Bankers Association), and Chang Kia-ngau who like he was, represented a new generation of modern bankers.

Half of his initial capital for the Shanghai Commercial and Savings Bank came from Li's sources.

In 1916, both K. P. Chen and Li Ming stood up for Chang Kia-ngau and accused the government of wrongfully issuing the order when Chang's Bank of China's Shanghai office got into trouble for refusing to obey the governments order to suspend banknote remittance. After this incident, the Bank of China was able to assert its independence from the Yuan Shikai regime in Beijing and started nearly two decades of tremendous growth as China's largest private bank.

K. P. Chen initially became close to Chang Kia-ngau when he became a private financial consultant to the Bank of China at the time between leaving the Kiangsu Provincial Bank and the founding of the Shanghai Commercial and Savings Bank.

Probably because of his tiny initial capital, K. P. Chen received a long term interbank deposit of 50,000 Yuan from Chang Kia-ngau's Bank of China as reserve capital encouraging close cooperation between the two banks. Chen and Chang shared a vision of using private capital to develop and modernize the country.

=== Liu Hongsheng, Insurance and The China Development Bank ===
In 1927 K. P. Chen teamed up with Liu Hongsheng (1888–1956) to establish an insurance company. Three years later Liu Hongsheng mortgaged his new eight-story group office building to K. P. Chen to raise the capital for launching The China Development Bank.

=== China's Wartime Finance Advisor ===
K. P. Chen was head of China's Currency Stabilization Board.

During World War II, the Shanghai Commercial and Savings Bank was devoted to consolidating the economy. In order to solve the financial problems, K. P. Chen represented the government of the Republic of China and negotiated with U.S.A. for loans. Some agreements were made:

- 1936: US-China Gold-Silver Agreement
- 1938: $25,000,000 Export-Import Bank loan
- 1939: Tung Oil Loan Agreement
- 1940: Tien Tin Loan Agreement

K. P. Chen led a Chinese delegation to Washington in 1936, seeking to persuade the United States to modify its silver purchasing policy.

In 1938 when the Chinese Ambassador Wellington Koo called on U. S. Secretary of the Treasury Henry Morgenthau to seek financial aid, the U. S. Secretary told him it might be advisable for the Chinese Government to send K. P. Chen (whom Morgenthau had negotiated with in the past) to America to enquire after credit for the purchase of flour and grain goods. The loan was to be based on tong oil exports.

In 1939 Finance Minister H.H. Kung, through K. P. Chen, endeavored to obtain assistance from the American Commercial Credit for the purchase of four airplanes, badly needed by the China National Aviation Corporation. K. P. Chen also participated in concluding a contract at Detroit to purchase 1,000 trucks from General Motors and Chrysler for the Chinese government.

In April 1940, K. P. Chen again traveled to the United States, this time to facilitate a loan based on tin exports from Yunnan.

Time magazine on Monday, Apr. 6, 1942 reported that "Shy, determined Chinese financier K.P. Chen stuck a feather in his cap last week. From Chungking he wired Manhattan's Universal Trading Corp. to pay the final installment on a $22,000,000 Export-Import Bank loan smack on the tung-oil barrel head—nearly two years before the last installment on the loan was due." This showed U.S. Treasury officials that China could do business even when Japan controlled its coast. When he sought to borrow money from Washington in 1938, democracy was not considered good security but tung oil, essential in high-grade paints and varnishes, was. To make this work he founded Universal Trading Corp. in Manhattan to manage tung-oil sales, budgeting one-half of the proceeds to repay the debt. He also organized Foo Shing Trading Corp. in China to gather and ship the oil.

K. P. Chen made outstanding contributions in stabilizing the monetary system and raising funds for war of resistance.

After the communist revolution in mainland China, K.P. Chen followed the Kuomintang-led government to Taiwan, though his Shanghai Commercial and Savings Bank was unable to reestablish its headquarters until 1954. In 1964, the bank was allowed to resume operations. It was the only private bank from the mainland which was allowed to resume commercial operations after the retreat to Taiwan. In 1976, K.P. Chen was succeeded by Chu Ju-tang as chairman of the bank.

=== Close Shave ===
In December 1941, K. P. Chen together with Finance Minister and Vice Premier H.H. Kung, his wife Soong Ai-ling and her sister, Madame Sun Yat-sen were caught in Hong Kong when war erupted in Asia. Amid a torrential downpour of bombs and artillery shells, K. P. Chen, Kung, and Madame Sun, were hustled into a plane, flown over the Japanese lines and set safely down, 200 miles inland. (From the Dec. 22, 1941 issue of TIME magazine).

=== Public Office ===
On April 17, 1947 Generalissimo Chiang Kai-shek, President of the National Government of the Republic of China nominated K. P. Chen to membership of the then new state council.

=== Afterwards ===
In 1949, Chen re-located from Shanghai to British Hong Kong. By that time, he had become skeptical of both sides of the Chinese Civil War, the Nationalists and the Communists.

Chen re-located to Taiwan in 1964.

=== Champion of Human Capital Development ===
K. P. Chen believed in the power of people and saw his investment in their development as an investment in the future profits of the bank.

He approved an annual budget of 12,000 tael in silver and invited a former manager of the Deutsch-Asiatische Bank to lecture his staff on the theory and practice of foreign exchange market.

He set up an educational fund to send senior managers to America to continue their education and practice advanced banking skills there.

The bank had a global business network through its overseas representative offices managed by its senior managers.

=== Other positions ===
- K. P. Chen, whose bank had been involved with the cotton industry since its early days, served as Chairman of the Cotton Control Commission or CCC. He was close to T. V. Soong, the Minister of Finance and Founder and Director of the National Economic Council, whose idea it was to make private entrepreneurs and capital a vital part of the CCC's nation-building efforts, and had long been involved in state-private projects sponsored by Soong.
- K. P. Chen was the dynamic chairman of the Universal Trading Corporation (UTC), a wholly owned subsidiary of China's Nationalist Government, formed for the purpose of promoting Sino-American foreign trade. Chen, a successful, self-made capitalist entrepreneur, believed that UTC could be the perfect vehicle for his stewardship of China’s postwar economic reconstruction. He also placed a premium on Sino-American cooperation and communication.
- K. P. Chen was Chairman of the China Committee of International Chamber of Commerce. He was also Chairman of China's Foreign Trade Commission.
- K. P. Chen was a signatory to the 1938 appeal for U. S. support by 10 Chinese Associations in Shanghai following the occupation of Manchuria by Japan. (United States Department of State / Foreign relations of the United States diplomatic papers, 1932. The Far East Volume III (1932) -- The Far Eastern crisis: occupation of Manchuria by Japan and statement of policy by the United States, pp. 1–754)
- K. P. Chen was a major financier of industrial projects. Often working together with others, he set up various textile, metals and trading companies. He was a member of the board of Fan Xudong's Yongli Group of Companies.

== Evaluation ==
Chen is considered one of China's most important bankers in the 20th century.

Linsun Cheng, in his Banking in Modern China: Entrepreneurs, Professional Managers, and the Development of Chinese, says, "It is almost impossible to describe any significant innovation in the history of modern Chinese banks without mentioning K. P. Chen's name."

On Monday, March 18, 1940, Time magazine described him thus:

"Middle-aged Banker Chen (University of Pennsylvania '09) looks so much like a Westerner's idea of a Chinese banker that wily and subtle-minded Americans have difficulty in believing he is as simple and direct as he is... bespectacled, careful, shy of the press, close-mouthed (in the Calvin Coolidge rather than Sumner Welles sense), he has no hobbies, makes no picturesque Oriental remarks, works 24 hours a day at the unglamorous business of cementing U.S.-Chinese trade relations, and considers Chinese repayment of U. S. loans his personal responsibility. His pride: that China has repaid $2,300,000 of her previous $25,000,000 loan, is now, because of U. S. needs for tung oil and tin, ahead of schedule."

The most important elements in his success were his American education and connections; his sense of professionalism (demonstrated by his opposition to official interference); his ability to compete and collaborate with foreign firms; his desire to innovate and explore various business strategies; his skill at obtaining community and professional support; and the unity of Chinese bankers.

== See also ==
- Chinese financial system
