= George Kao =

Chinese-American author, translator and journalist

George Kao 高克毅
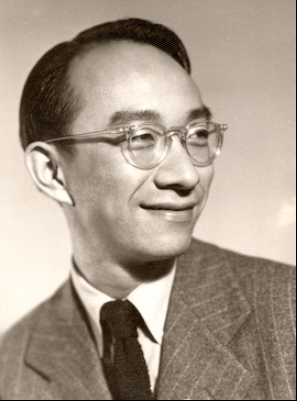
- Kao, c. 1946
- Born: May 29, 1912; Ann Arbor, Michigan
- Died: March 22, 2008 (aged 95); Winter Park, Florida
- Resting place: Palm Cemetery, Winter Park
- Education: Yenching University; University of Missouri; Columbia University
- Occupations: Writer, translator, journalist
- Spouse: Maeching Li Kao 高李梅卿
- Writing career
- Pen name: 喬志高 Qiao Zhigao

George Kao (Chinese: 高克毅; pinyin: Gāo Kèyì; 29 May 1912 – 1 March 2008) was a Chinese American author, translator, and journalist. He is best known for translating English-language classics into Chinese and for his efforts to bring Chinese classics to English-speaking audiences.

== Biography ==
Kao was born in Ann Arbor, Michigan in the United States to parents who were studying as Boxer Rebellion Indemnity Scholarship Program students and moved with them to China at age three, living in Nanjing, Beijing, and Shanghai. He graduated from Yenching University in 1933 and returned to the United States, enrolling in the University of Missouri School of Journalism, where he received a Master's degree in 1934, and Columbia University, where he received a Master's degree in 1937.

From 1937–47, Kao worked for the Publications Section of the Chinese News Service, Inc., a news agency sponsored by the Republic of China's Board of Information and Ministry of Foreign Affairs. There he edited a daily news bulletin called The Voice of China based on radio reports from Chongqing, the Republic's capital during World War II. In 1939, Kao was a journalist in New York. He served as a correspondent for China Press and China Weekly Review in Shanghai. In New York, an association named The Foreign Press Association was formed by foreign journalists. Kao was the only Chinese journalist among fifteen members. They wrote a book together called You Americans. In the book, Kao titled his chapter " Your Country and My People" as a play on Lin Yutang's book My Country and My People.

From 1947–49, he worked for China's newly formed Government Information Office as director of the West Coast office and, later, as editor-in-chief of The Chinese Press (華美周報 Huá-Měi Zhōubào).From 1951–53, Kao was a Chinese-language Instructor at the United States Department of Defense's Defense Language Institute in Monterey, California. In 1957, he became chief editor for the Washington, D.C. Voice of America's radio Chinese Broadcast, and later deputy director of the China Branch, and resided in nearby Kensington, Maryland. In 1972, he moved to Hong Kong as a visiting senior fellow at the newly founded Research Centre for Translation at the Chinese University of Hong Kong. He returned to Kensington, Maryland in 1976 and lived in Rockville, Maryland and in Florida for the remainder of his life. His wife of 57 years, Maeching Li Kao (born ca. 1920), died on 25 July 2003 and Kao himself died in 2008 at the Mayflower retirement home in Winter Park, Florida.

Before his death, Kao established the George and Maeching Kao Endowment for Chinese Studies at Rollins College in Winter Park, Florida. The memorial funding, a living testimony to Kao's lifelong dedication to promoting mutual understanding between the American and Chinese peoples, provides funding for scholarship, language learning and library purchases each year.

== Writings and translations ==
Kao was prolific as a translator from both English to Chinese and Chinese to English. He is known in the Chinese world as the translator of several classics of English-language literature and as the author of several books on the English language and about the United States. Among his literary translations are F. Scott Fitzgerald's The Great Gatsby, Thomas Wolfe's Look Homeward Angel, and Eugene O'Neill's Long Day's Journey Into Night. With his brother Irving K.Y. Kao, he was Co-Editor of a popular New Dictionary of Idiomatic American English, published by both the Chinese University Press and Peking University Press in traditional and simplified Chinese editions, respectively. He also translated numerous Chinese works into English. At the Chinese University of Hong Kong, he founded (in 1973) and served as Editor of the highly regarded Renditions which translates classical and contemporary Chinese literature into English. He also contributed a number of translations to the journal himself. He edited or translated several of Taiwan author Pai Hsien-yung's collections into English.

=== Selected works ===
Some works written or edited by George Kao include:

- New Dictionary of Idiomatic American English: A Compendium of Popular Words and Phrases (coedited with Irving K.Y. Kao) (1994) ISBN 978-962-996-200-5
- Cathay by the Bay: San Francisco Chinatown in 1950 (1987) ISBN 978-962-201-423-7
- The Translation of Things Past: Chinese History and Historiography (1982) ISBN 978-0-295-95910-8
- Two Writers and the Cultural Revolution: Lao She and Chen Jo-hsi (1980) ISBN 978-962-201-202-8
- 紐約客談 (Niǔyuē Kètán) (1964) (in Chinese)
- The Collected Wartime Messages of Generalissimo Chiang Kai-shek, 1937–1945 (1946) ISBN 978-0-527-16800-1
- Chinese Wit and Humor (1946) ISBN 978-0-8069-8003-4

=== Selected translations ===
- The Great Gatsby (大亨小傳) F. Scott Fitzgerald. (1971) (in Chinese) ISBN 978-957-13-3524-7
- Long Day's Journey Into Night (長夜漫漫路迢迢). Eugene O'Neill. (1973) (in Chinese) ISBN 957-39-0215-X
- Look Homeward, Angel (天使，望故鄉). Thomas Wolfe. (1985) (in Chinese) ISBN 978-7-108-00003-3
- Taipei People (台北人) Pai Hsien-yung (白先勇). (2000) (in Chinese and English) ISBN 978-962-201-859-4
- 四十自述 Autobiography at Forty. 胡适 (Hu Shih). (2016) (in Chinese and English) ISBN 978-7-5135-7429-7

== Additional sources ==
- Joe Holley. "George Kao; Writer-Translator Helped Readers in China, U.S. Share Cultures." (Obituary). Washington Post. 7 March 2008. p. B07.
- "George Kao 高克毅." at National Taiwan University Library website (in Chinese and English)
