= David Sze =

American businessman

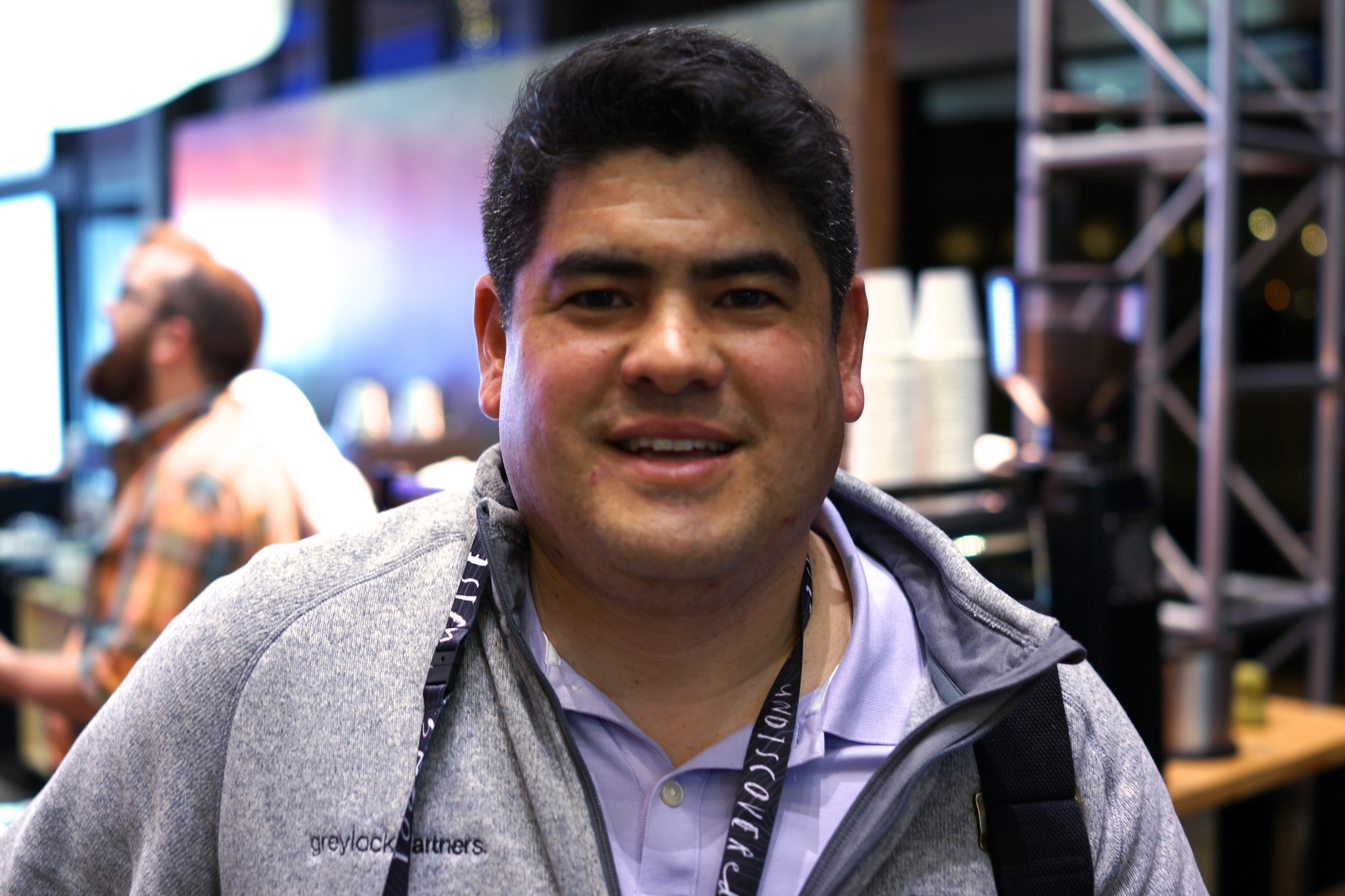
- Sze in 2013
- Born: March 8, 1966 (age 60)
- Education: Yale University, Stanford University
- Occupations: Entrepreneur; investor
- Known for: Managing partner in venture capital firm Greylock Partners
- Relatives: Sarah Sze (sister), Szeming Sze (grandfather)

David Sze is an American entrepreneur, investor, and managing partner at the venture capital firm Greylock Partners. He is a member of the Northern Lights Venture Capital Board of Advisors and oversees Greylock’s investments in those funds.

He was named on Forbes's Midas List in 2013 and 2014. He is also a Trustee of Yale University and Rockefeller University.

== Early life and education ==
Sze was born in Massachusetts in 1966. His father, Chia-Ming Sze, was an architect who moved to the United States from Shanghai at age four and his mother, Judy Mossman, was an Anglo-Scottish-Irish schoolteacher. He obtained a BA from Yale University and an MBA from Stanford University.

== Career ==
=== Excite, Inc. ===
Before joining Greylock Partners in 2000, Sze was SVP of Product Strategy at Excite and then Excite@Home. Sze's Prior roles at Excite included general manager of Excite.com and vice president of Content and Programming for the Excite Network.

=== Greylock Partners ===
Sze joined Greylock in 2000 as a result of his involvement in consumer companies. Greylock moved their headquarters from Boston to Silicon Valley’s Sand Hill Road. Sze led early investments in companies including Facebook, Pandora, LinkedIn, Workday, and Palo Alto Networks. In 2013, Sze and Reid Hoffman announced Greylock's 14th fund of $1 billion.

Sze has previously invested in NOCpulse, New Edge Networks, Oodle, Revision3, SGN, SoftCoin, VUDU, and Digg, all of which have been acquired by larger companies.

== Personal life ==
His sister is artist Sarah Sze. His grandfather, Szeming Sze, helped establish the UN's World Health Organization.
