= Greylock Partners =

American venture capital firm

Greylock Partners, LLC
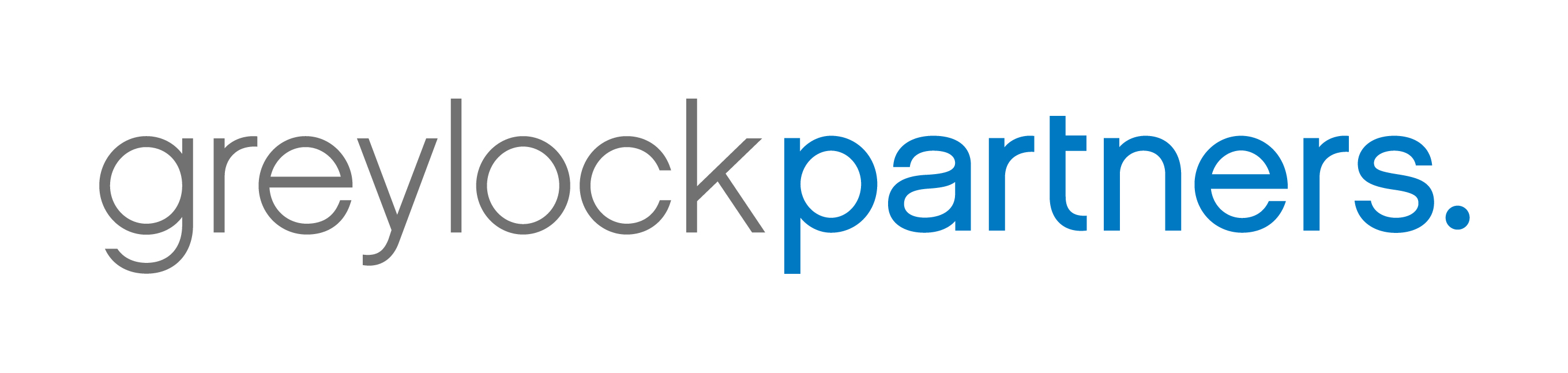

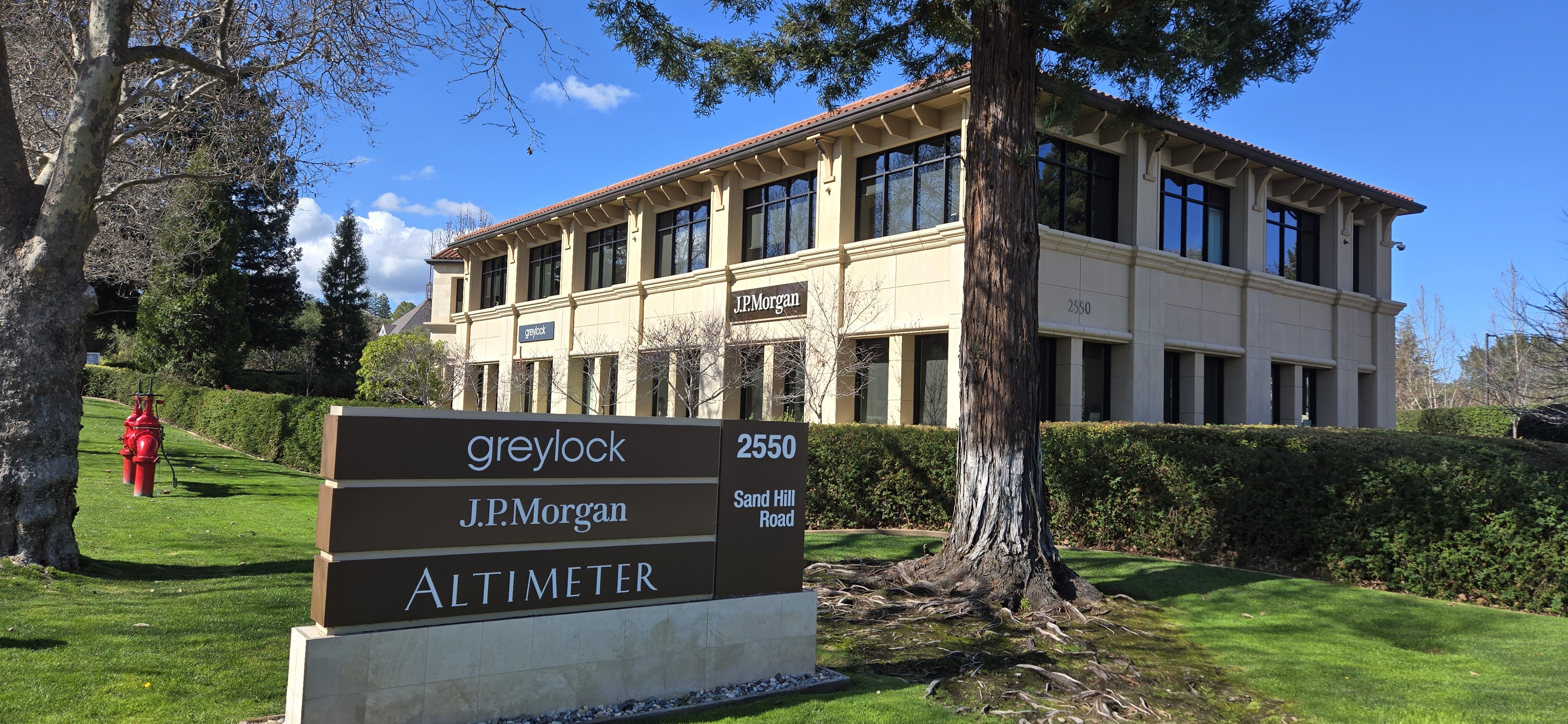
- Type: Private
- Industry: Venture capital
- Founded: 1965; 61 years ago in Cambridge, Massachusetts, U.S.
- Founders: Bill Elfers; Dan Gregory
- Headquarters: Menlo Park, California, U.S.
- Total assets: $3.5 billion
- Number of employees: 30+
- Website: greylock.com

Greylock Partners is one of the oldest venture capital firms, founded in 1965, with committed capital of over $3.5 billion under management. The firm focuses on early-stage companies in consumer and enterprise software.

== History ==
Former corporate logo (used until 2010)

Greylock was founded in 1965 in Cambridge, Massachusetts by Bill Elfers and Dan Gregory, joined shortly thereafter by Charlie Waite. Elfers and Waite had both worked at American Research and Development Corporation. The original capital of $10 million was committed by a group of six families. The company opened a second fund in 1973. The company opened its first office in Silicon Valley in 1999.

Greylock closed its 12th fund in 2005 with $500 million. In 2009, Greylock relocated its headquarters from the original Boston location to Silicon Valley. Also in 2009, Greylock opened its 13th fund with $575 million. In 2011, the 13th fund was increased to $1 billion. The company organized a 14th fund in 2013 with $1 billion.

In 2014, Greylock launched Communities, a series of networking events centered on areas like design, big data, infrastructure engineering, user growth, data science, and network security. The communities are composed of product managers, engineers, and technologists from Silicon Valley's largest and fastest growing companies who meet once a quarter. Their branch in Israel formerly known as Greylock IL was rebranded as 83north in January 2015.

The company organized a 15th fund in 2016 with $1 billion. In 2020, it organized a 16th fund with $1 billion, and in 2021, the company raised an additional $500 million for the 16th fund to be used exclusively on seed deals. In 2023 the company announced they had raised $1 billion for the 17th fund. The 18th fund, of $1.5 billion, was raised by 2026 and they estimated that they would invest in about 25 companies from the fund.

Greylock partners include David Sze, Reid Hoffman, and Mustafa Suleyman.
