= Sarah Sze =

American artist (born 1969)

- Born: 1969 (age 56–57); Boston, Massachusetts, U.S.
- Education: Yale University (BA); School of Visual Arts (MFA)
- Known for: Sculpture and Painting
- Spouse(s): M.,Siddhartha Mukherjee 2004; Div., 2025
- Awards: MacArthur Fellow; 2003; US Representative for the Venice Biennale; 2013
- Website: sarahsze.com

Sarah Sze (/ˈziː/; born 1969) is an American artist and professor of visual arts at Columbia University. Sze's work explores the role of technology, information, and memory using everyday materials. Her work often represents objects caught in suspension. Drawing from Modernist traditions, Sze confronts the relationship between low-value mass-produced objects in high-value institutions, creating the sense that everyday life objects can be art. She has exhibited internationally and her works are in the collections of several major museums.

== Early life and education ==
Sze was born in Boston in 1969. Her father, Chia-Ming Sze, was an architect who moved to the United States from Shanghai at age four and her mother, Judy Mossman, was an Anglo-Scottish-Irish schoolteacher. Sze's great-grandfather, Alfred Sao-ke Sze, was the first Chinese student to go to Cornell University. He was China's minister to Britain and later ambassador to the United States. Her grandfather is Szeming Sze who was the initiator of World Health Organization.

Sze reports that as a child she would draw constantly. She attended Milton Academy as a day student and Yale University where she graduated summa cum laude with a BA in Architecture and Painting in 1991 and completed her M.F.A. from the School of Visual Arts in 1997.

== Career ==
Sze's work has been featured in The Whitney Biennial (2000), the Carnegie International (1999) and several international biennials, including Berlin (1998), Guangzhou (2015), Liverpool (2008), Lyon (2009), São Paulo (2002), and Venice (1999, 2013, and 2015).

Sze has created public artworks for the Massachusetts Institute of Technology, the Walker Art Center, and the High Line in New York.

Sze is a 2003 MacArthur Fellow and was granted a Louis Comfort Tiffany Foundation Biennial Competition Award in 1999.

In 2013, Sze represented the United States at the Venice Biennale with an exhibition called Triple Point.

On January 1, 2017, a permanent installation commissioned by MTA Arts & Design of drawings by Sze on ceramic tiles opened in the 96th Street subway station on the new Second Avenue Subway line in New York City.

In 2020, Sze unveiled Shorter than the Day, a permanent installation, in LaGuardia Airport

In 2021, Sze unveiled her most recent permanent installation, Fallen Sky, at Storm King Art Center, Cornwall, New York.

In 2023, Sze transformed a large Victorian waiting room at Peckham Rye Station in London into an immersive installation called The Waiting Room. Tabish Khan, when reviewing the exhibition for Culture Whisper wrote “this installation fills us with a sense of awe”. For her 2023 exhibition called Timelapse at the Solomon R. Guggenheim Museum in New York, Sze created a series of site-specific installations through the Frank Lloyd Wright building. In 2023, Sze was featured in Art21's New York Closeup Series.

From July 13, 2025-July 2026, the Denver Art Museum exhibited Fuse Box: Sarah Sze. The exhibit displayed Sleepers, an art installation that entered the Museum’s collection in 2024.

In April 2026, Sze was commissioned to create Wave to be displayed in the Barclay Center’s atrium; the work “will consist of more than 250 screens capturing animated projections and images.”

== Process ==
Sze draws from Modernist traditions of the found objects, to build large-scale installations. She uses everyday items like string, Q-tips, photographs, and wire to create complex compositions resembling constellations. This composition gives her work a chaotic yet precise style with the overlap of materials. All objects, regardless of size, are related to one another. This creates a larger meaning in her work as all of the pieces come together to convey a message. By Sze remolding and reshaping these everyday objects, she additionally changes the value of these materials. The incorporation of these "low value" objects rejects the traditional standard that sculptures have to be solid, limited in geometric shapes, and work with specific materials. This can be displayed with Sze's intentional inclusion of the unseen process materials (ladders, clips, wooden poles, etc.) being included in her final work.

Sze throughout her career has pushed the boundaries with sculpture. This can be seen in her using her works to convey movement. Through precise planning and strategic considerations, Sze strives to make the inanimate look animate. Using influences from her formal training in painting and architecture, Sze looks into what one can do with a sculpture that is limited to the two-dimensional. The effect of this is to "challenge the very material of sculpture, the very constitution of sculpture, as a solid form that has to do with finite geometric constitutions, shapes, and content."

Sze additionally takes into consideration the viewer's interaction with her works and the objects she has chosen to display. When selecting materials, Sze focuses on the exploration of value acquisition–what value the object holds and how it is acquired. In an interview with curator Okwui Enwezor, Sze explained that during her conceptualization process, she will "choreograph the experience to create an ebb and flow of information [...] thinking about how people approach, slow down, stop, perceive [her art]."

== Significance ==
Sze's work encapsulates how an individual perceives everyday life and their environment. The recording of objects with memory is one of the ways Sze represents this idea. In her works like Timekeeper, Sze Creates a time capsule, allowing her to directly connect with the objects she utilized with the piece to the year. With Sze reconstructing former works, she has the record of what she originally used but now can add new materials, creating an entirely new time capsule. Time itself is a strong theme Sze plays into with the concept of the multiplicity of the unknown. This is created by her works veering off the canvas in multiple directions leads to this theme of the plurality of the unknown. Time and memory in Sze's work can also be seen with the distortion of images throughout time. Sze in her print installations has referenced prior works, relying on memory to reconstruct the former work in her current project. This not only reflects her prior work but also highlights how objects change over time in memory. Sze goes into additional detail about pictures and how this method can be used to retain a sculpture. Sze choice of materials is one of the key factors when taking in her works. The inclusion of these mass-produced objects additionally alludes to domestic life and the feeling of overabundance and growth. Having these daily objects collected, layered, or stacked on one another can be seen in her conveying an overwhelming or cramped space.

By working with sculpture, Sze is conscious of the space not only her work is located but also the space her works create. Sze's spherical work creates the opportunity for viewers to walk inside the work, creating an immersive experience. This choice is made whether or not the audience is aware when they enter the work they are part of the work or not. With Sze's background and upbringing in architecture, she is methodical in how visitors will encounter her work and how a gallery space will shape and form her work. This consideration deepens Sze's contemplation of whether there is a history to tell with the architecture or if it is there to guide the audience. The space Sze creates in her works reflects her choice of objects, creating a relationship with her work and the location where they intertwine. Within the space Sze creates especially with her suspending installation works, there is a feeling with these works of fragility to them. Yet through the deliberate process of aligning every object to one another, there is a strategic method to its fragile look. Sze’s consideration of space dates back to her early career; in her first museum show after graduate school, Migrateurs in 1997 at Musée d’Art Moderne de Paris, she aimed to occupy “the space between an object we consider art, and an object we think is essential to survival” through the use of exit signs as an art material

With works located in the natural environment, Sze also takes into consideration the context where her work will reside. This can be seen in what she wants her works to not only convey but be of value. With her Storm King Art Center permanent commission, Fallen Sky creates the infusion and disintegration of the extra-terrestrial material to become one with the ground. Other outside installations like Still Life with Landscape take into consideration the natural habitat and include those needs with the structure, creating a seamless interconnection with the composition of the work.

== Exhibitions ==
Sze has staged a large number of solo exhibitions and shows across the United States and internationally. Her notable solo exhibitions include White Room (1997), White Columns, New York; Sarah Sze (1999), Museum of Contemporary Art, Chicago; Sarah Sze: The Triple Point of Water (2003-2004), originating at the Whitney Museum, New York; Triple Point (2013), American pavilion, 55th Venice Biennale; Sarah Sze: Timelapse (2023), Solomon R. Guggenheim Museum, New York; and Sarah Sze: Feel Free (2026), Gagosian Gallery, Los Angeles.

Sze has also participated in a wide array of group exhibitions, including the Berlin Biennale (1998); 48th and 56th Venice Biennale (1999, 2015); Whitney Biennial (2000); and Liverpool Biennial (2008). Her work was included in the 2024 exhibition Making Their Mark: Works from the Shah Garg Collection at the Berkeley Art Museum and Pacific Film Archive (BAMPFA).

== Personal life ==
Sze has one brother, the venture capitalist David Sze. Sze lives in New York City with her two daughters. She was divorced from Siddhartha Mukherjee on January 21, 2025.

== Notable works in public collections ==
- Seamless (1999), Tate, London
- Many a Slip (1999), Museum of Contemporary Art, Los Angeles
- Strange Attractor (2000), Whitney Museum, New York
- Things Fall Apart (2001), San Francisco Museum of Modern Art
- Untitled (Table Top) (2001), Harvard Art Museums, Cambridge, Massachusetts
- Grow or Die (2002), Walker Art Center, Minneapolis
- The Letting Go (2002), Museum of Fine Arts, Boston
- Everything in its right place (2002-2003), National Gallery of Victoria, Melbourne, Australia
- The Art of Losing (2004), 21st Century Museum of Contemporary Art, Kanazawa, Japan
- Blue Poles (2004), List Visual Arts Center, Cambridge, Massachusetts
- Second Means of Egress (Orange) (2004), Buffalo AKG Art Museum, Buffalo, New York
- Sexton (from Triple Point of Water) (2004-2005), Detroit Institute of Arts
- Proportioned to the Groove (2005), Museum of Contemporary Art, Chicago
- 360 (Portable Planetarium) (2010), National Gallery of Canada, Ottawa
- Triple Point (Pendulum) (2013), Museum of Modern Art, New York
- Mirror with Landscape Leaning (Fragment Series) (2015), Yale University Art Gallery, New Haven, Connecticut
- Plywood Sunset Leaning (Fragment Series) (2015), Cleveland Museum of Art
- Split Stone (Northwest) (2019), Western Gallery, Western Washington University, Bellingham
- Migrateurs (1997), Museum of Modern Art, New York

== Awards and honors ==
- 2025 – Meraki Artist Award, Institute of Contemporary Art, Boston, MA
- 2024 – Elected to the Royal Academy of Arts in London, as an Honorary Royal Academician (HonRA).
- 2022 – Asia Arts Game Change Award
- 2020 – Inductee, American Academy of Arts and Sciences
- 2018 – American Academy of Arts and Letters, New York
- 2013 – US Representative for the Venice Biennale
- 2005 – Radcliffe Fellowship
- 2003 – MacArthur Fellowship
