= Chekiang First Bank =

Hong Kong bank

- 浙江第一銀行
- Formation: 1907
- Dissolved: 2004
- Type: Bank
- Location: Hong Kong

Chekiang First Bank
- Traditional Chinese: 浙江第一銀行
Transcriptions
Yue: Cantonese
- Yale Romanization: Jit gōng daih yāt ngàhn hòhng
- Jyutping: Zit3 gong1 dai6 jat1 ngan4 hong4

Chekiang First Bank was a bank in Hong Kong incorporated in 1950 by Li Ming. It is now merged to Wing Hang Bank. At the time of the merger with Wing Hang, Chekiang First Bank had 17 branches in Hong Kong, a wholly owned subsidiary in Luxembourg, an agency in San Francisco, and a representative office in Shanghai. As of 31 December 2002, Chekiang First had total assets of HK$27.8 billion. Wing Hang subsequent re-branded all services under the Wing Hang brand.

== History ==
- 1907: Founded under the name Chekiang Provincial and Industrial Bank, with headquarters in Hangzhou.
- 1911: Restructured as Chekiang Bank of the Republic of China (Chinese: 中華民國浙江銀行).
- 1912: Restructured as the Chekiang Provincial and Industrial Bank (Chinese: 浙江地方實業銀行).
- 1923: Li Ming converted the bank's Shanghai branch into the Chekiang Industrial Bank (Chinese: 浙江實業銀行), with headquarters in Shanghai, and became its director.
- 1948: Restructured as Chekiang First Bank.
- 1950: Re-established in Hong Kong as Chekiang First Bank of Commerce (Chinese: 浙江第一商業銀行).
- 1962: Japan's Dai-Ichi Kangyo Bank (now the Mizuho Corporate Bank), acquired a 30% stake in the bank, a stake that eventually it increased to 95%.
- 2003: Acquired by Wing Hang Bank.
- 2004: Merged to Wing Hang Bank.
