= Sanitas (health insurance) =

Spanish international health care company

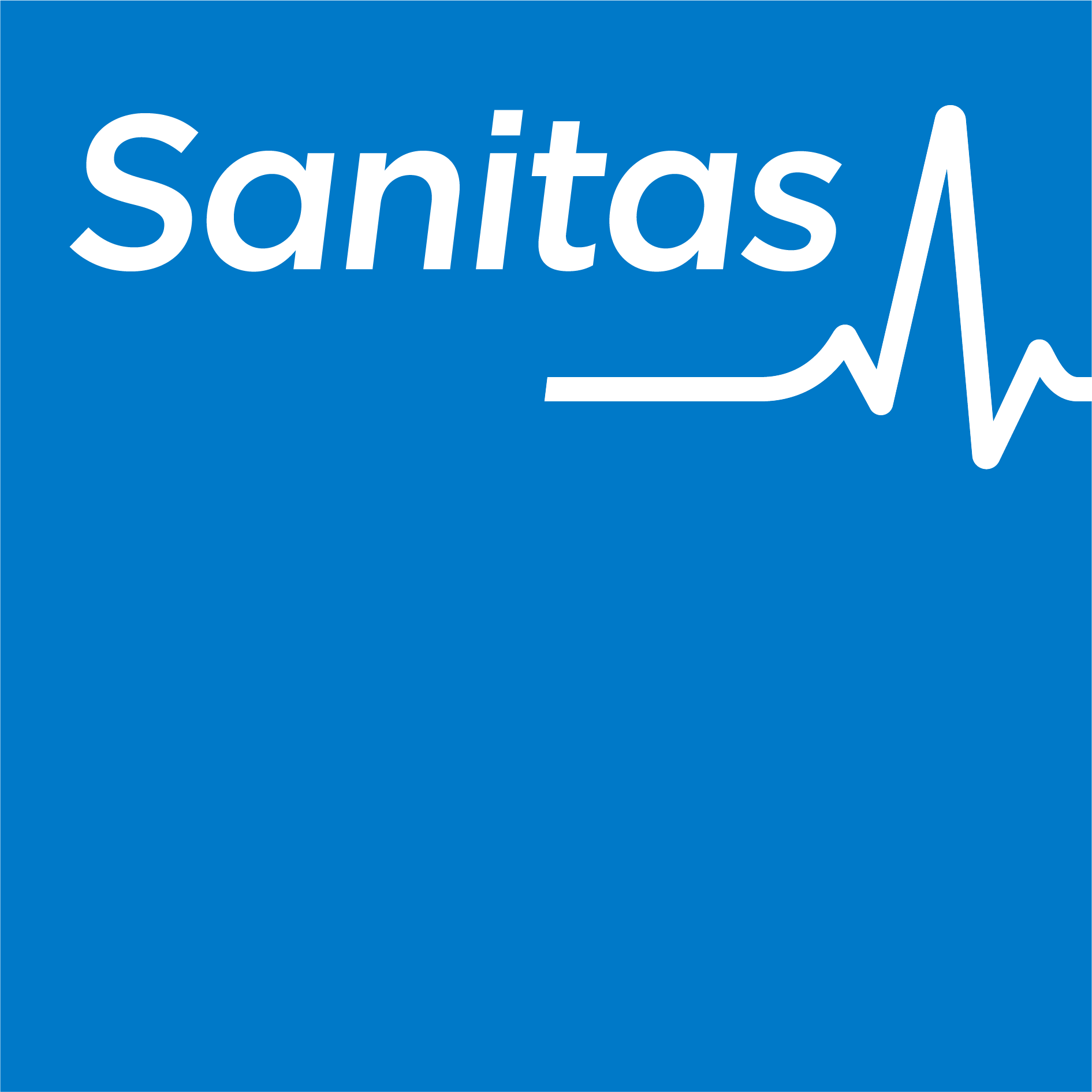
- Type: S.A.
- Industry: Health Insurance; Healthcare
- Founded: 1954
- Headquarters: Madrid, Spain
- Key people: Carlos Jaureguizar
- Services: Health Insurance; Healthcare services
- Revenue: ▲€2,886 million (2024)
- Net income: ▲€219 million (2024)
- Owner: Bupa
- Number of employees: 11,360 (2024)
- Website: www.sanitas.es

Sanitas is a Spanish insurance company and provider of health and wellness services. It was founded in 1954 by a group of Spanish doctors, and became part of the British United Provident Association (BUPA) in 1989.

== Care network ==
Sanitas has a medical team of over 56,000 specialists and 4,240 affiliated medical centres. It also has five hospitals of its own: four in Madrid (Sanitas La Moraleja University Hospital, Sanitas La Zarzuela University Hospital, Virgen del Mar Hospital and Blua Sanitas Valdebebas Hospital) and one in Barcelona (Cima Hospital). In addition, Sanitas has 31 multi-speciality medical centres, 25 advanced rehabilitation centres and 218 dental clinics. It also has 46 nursing homes, 18 of which offer day centre services, as well as professional home care services.

== Preventive healthcare ==
The preventive healthcare programme 'Mi Salud Genómica' (My Genomic Health) has been in operation since 2024 with the aim of preventing and detecting genetically predisposed diseases, thus enabling the development of personalised medicine. The programme involves sequencing each patient's genome through a blood test to detect disease risk, creating a personalised health plan and preventive genomic programmes for nutrition and physical activity, as well as producing a pharmacogenomic report for the application of personalised treatments and dosages.

== History ==
The company's origins are linked to health insurance in Spain. This type of insurance emerged within the medical community as a separate entity from the sickness and accident insurance covered by mutual societies in the 19th century. Health insurance experienced significant growth in the second half of the 20th century, with over 150 professional groups providing medical services in exchange for a monthly payment ('iguala'). The Insurance Act of 1954 brought about radical changes to these health and medical insurance schemes, requiring them to convert into public limited companies. These entities offered services that covered benefits not included in public health services until 1967, and by the 1990s they were reaching increasingly broader sections of society.

=== Origin ===
The CEYDE (Electrosurgical and Specialty Centre) was one of the mutual aid medical societies of the mid-20th century. It was founded by Marcial Gómez Gil and his wife. In 1954, he purchased the CEYDE clinic, a historic building located in the heart of Madrid, and collaborated with fellow physicians to establish the Sanitas Medical and Surgical Mutual Aid Society. Following the enactment of the Insurance Act on 29 October 1956, Sanitas became a public limited company under the name Sanitas, S.A., with an initial share capital of 3 million pesetas. The shares were distributed among the doctors who were members of the mutual society: Marcial Gómez Gil (1,500 shares), Fernando Vaamonde Valencia (662 shares), Manuel Herrera de Cabo (653 shares), Germán Alonso González (300 shares), Victoriano Jabara Elizondo (53 shares), Vicente Gutiérrez Asensio (43 shares) and Teodoro Ventura Richard (40 shares). Initial management was carried out by the main shareholders. Gómez Gil was the CEO and Vaamonde was the chairman. The company's primary purpose was health insurance, although it also offered health and funeral insurance, albeit with limited success.

=== Development since 1960 ===
From 1960 onwards, when the company began to make a profit, some of these profits were used to increase doctors' fees, provide sickness and death benefits for doctors and offer scholarships for the children of collaborating doctors. From the outset, the company had a General Assembly of Doctors and a Board on which doctors and employees were represented; both groups were shareholders. This was a new private healthcare model which enabled many doctors in the public sector to develop a complementary model and gave many patients access to personalised, high-quality medicine. Dr Gómez Gil's work was continued by his son, Marcial Gómez Sequeira, as executive chairman, and Alfonso Martínez Gastey, as managing director, until the company was acquired by Bupa.

In 1985, they founded the first entirely private clinic: the Hospital Sanitas La Zarzuela. During the 1980s, demand for health insurance increased notably due to the deterioration of Social Security services.

=== Integration into Bupa ===
In 1989, the company was acquired by Bupa, a British multinational insurance company and international healthcare group headquartered in the United Kingdom. Gómez Sequeira's team opted for Bupa when they learned that it was not going to be a speculative financial operation, but rather that Bupa was going to stay and become involved in the development of Sanitas in Spain. At that time, Bupa was referred to as the 'English Sanitas' because the British company had three million members in the UK, twelve prestigious clinics in various British cities, and 120 million members in twenty countries. In 1989, Sanitas had one million members and 20,000 doctors in Spain. The sale process was facilitated by the socialist government and Minister Julián García Vargas.

In 2003, Sanitas began diversifying into the nursing home sector and occupational risk management, as well as investing in information technology.

Between 2008 and 2021, the chief executive officer was Iñaki Ereño, and between 2021 and 2025 it was Iñaki Peralta. In 2025, Carlos Jaureguizar was appointed chief executive officer.

== Digitisation ==
The company launched its digitisation process in 2016, with the acceleration of this change being driven by the subsequent outbreak of the Coronavirus (Covid-19) pandemic. Since then, the process has incorporated different sectors and services:

- digital monitoring of chronic conditions and prevention using artificial intelligence, big data and digital devices such as scales, thermometers and pulse oximeters;

- extension of medical coverage through video consultations in nursing homes with follow-up for family members;

- dental detection and prevention using new technologies and robotics;

- digitisation of hospitals and home hospitalisation using devices for continuous monitoring of clinical parameters and cloud-based consultations. The Blua Sanitas Valdebebas Hospital opened in 2025 and was designed as a digitally integrated hospital.

== International Expansion ==
In 2012, the Bupa Group tasked Sanitas with developing its business in Europe and Latin America. Sanitas's headquarters in Madrid oversee its subsidiaries in Poland, Turkey, Brazil, Mexico, and Chile. A coordination centre in Miami provides services to operations in Bolivia, Colombia, Guatemala, Peru, Ecuador, Panama, and the Dominican Republic.

The group's expansion is achieved through the purchase of clinics and hospitals, such as the acquisition of Hospital Bité Médica in Mexico City; or Swissmed Hospital in Pomerania (Poland); partnerships with other insurance companies, such as the one with Mapfre to offer insurance in Peru, Uruguay and Paraguay; and the purchase of leading insurance companies, such as Acıbadem Insurance in Turkey, which was renamed Bupa Acıbadem Sigorta.

In 2026, the company is in the midst of an expansion process for which it had mobilised investments totalling €555 million from its own funds and other partners. In 2025, it opened the Blua Sanitas Valdebebas Hospital, and it plans to open three new hospitals: Sanitas Arganzuela Hospital, as well as Marina Hospital in Barcelona and Portitxol Hospital in Palma de Mallorca, through an agreement with Mapfre. Sanitas Mayores is set to open three new care homes by 2026. This will represent an investment of over €480 million.

== Economic figures ==
In 2024, the company's turnover was €2.886 billion, which was 9% higher than the previous year. Operating profit before tax and financial items increased by 4% to €219 million. The company continues to grow in terms of its workforce. Its workforce grew to 11,360, marking a 6.1% increase from the previous year. Sanitas has strengthened its healthcare team, increasing the number of doctors in its hospitals and centres by 6% (640 professionals).

The company distributes health insurance policies through BBVA, Banco Sabadell, Santalucía and Generali, with 2.9 million customers.
