= Carlos Jaureguizar =

Spanish executive in the healthcare sector

- Born: 1981 (age 44–45); Seville
- Citizenship: Spanish
- Education: Degree Business Administration and Management CUNEF; MBA INSEAD; AMP Harvard Business School
- Occupations: CEO of Sanitas and Bupa Europe & Latin America
- Employer: Bupa
- Predecessor: Iñaki Peralta
- Website: https://corporativo.sanitas.es/

Carlos Jaureguizar (born in Seville in 1981) is a senior Spanish executive in the healthcare sector. Since 2026 he has been chief executive officer (CEO) of Sanitas and Bupa Europe & Latin America, a British multinational healthcare group. Throughout his professional career he has led international operations in Europe, Asia and Latin America, and is recognised for his contributions to digital transformation and international expansion.

== Education and professional career ==
He holds a degree in Business Administration and Management from Colegio Universitario de Estudios Financieros (CUNEF), an MBA from the INSEAD Business School in France, and an AMP from Harvard Business School.

Jaureguizar began working in investment banking in London, working as a mergers and acquisitions analyst at Credit Suisse and later as a consultant at Accenture, before joining Sanitas in 2006, a Spanish insurance and healthcare company that has been part of the Bupa Group since 1989.

== Sanitas/Bupa ==
He began his career at Sanitas and the Bupa Group in 2006, and since then has held various executive and management positions in the company. Between 2006 and 2012, he was Director of Strategy and Acquisitions (M&A). After six years in this role, he expanded his responsibilities as CFO for the Europe and Latin America (ELA) market unit.

Jaureguizar was general manager of Bupa Chile from 2018 to 2021. During this time, he strengthened the company's hospital infrastructure and drove the digital transformation in the insurance sector and healthcare network. This process was accelerated in the context of the 2019–2020 pandemic.

From 2021 to 2025, he was the CEO of Bupa Global in India and the United Kingdom, managing local and international health insurance and medical provision networks from the London headquarters. During this period, he expanded the healthcare network in the UK, increased Bupa's stake in Indian insurer Niva Bupa through its IPO, and promoted the private genomics programme My Genomic Health, which integrates genetic sequencing into everyday medical care.

In 2026, Jaureguizar became CEO of Sanitas and the Bupa Europe & Latin America market unit, returning to the Sanitas headquarters in Spain. From this position, he also leads Bupa's businesses in Poland, Turkey, Chile, Brazil, Mexico, Portugal, Ecuador, the Dominican Republic, Panama, Peru and Guatemala.

== Acknowledgements ==
- Healthy Communities Strategy, BITC Leadership Summit 2024
- ecoDisruptive Programme, Pharma & Healthcare category, Campaign Brand Leadership and Partnership Awards (2024)
- Global Healthcare Climate Champion, Environmental Finance Company Awards (2024)
