= Sanitas =

Sanitas may refer to:

- Sanitas (health insurance), Spanish health insurance company
- AB Sanitas, a Lithuanian pharmaceutical company
