= Iñaki Peralta =

Spanish economist

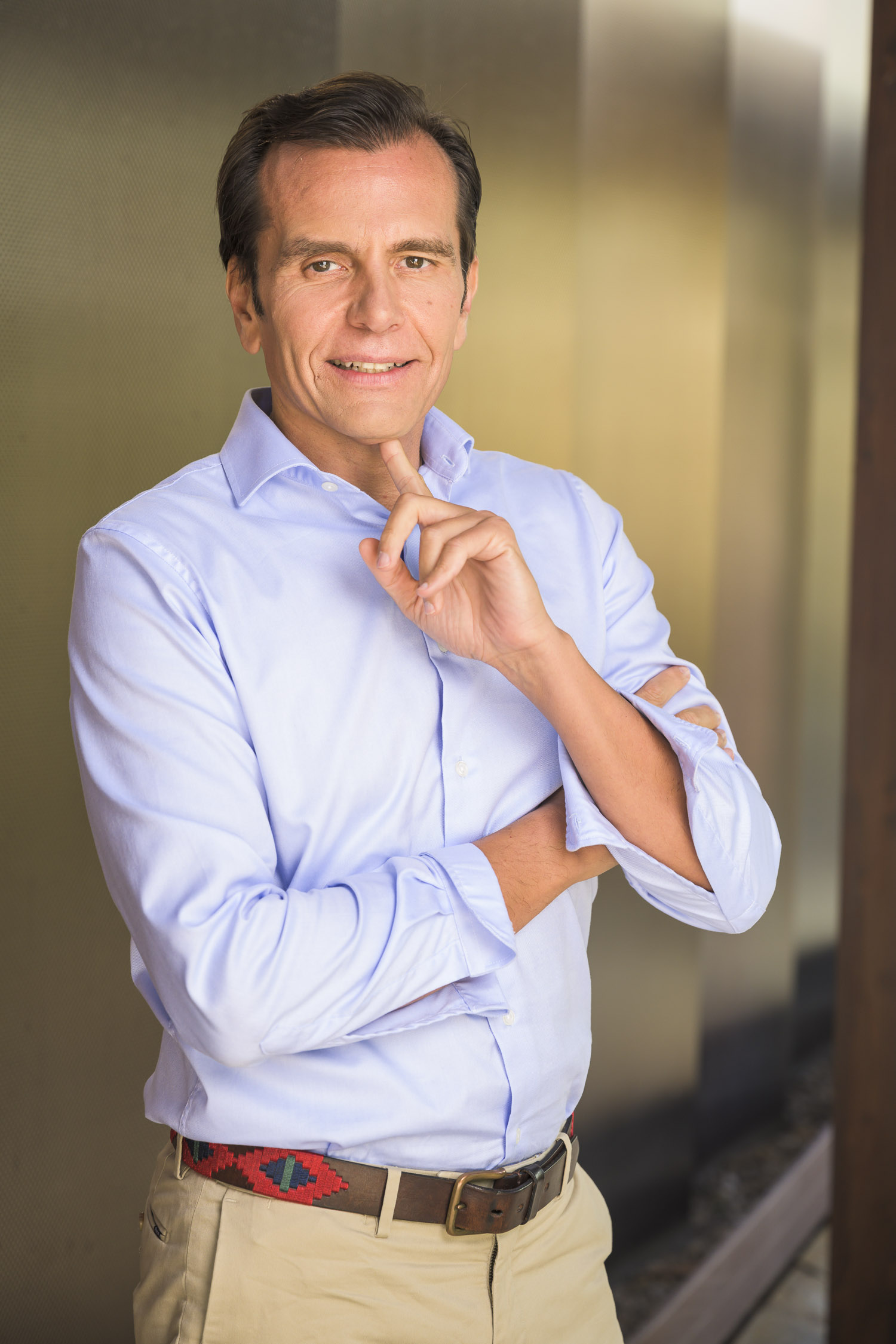
- Born: 1973 (age 52–53); Pamplona, Spain
- Education: University of Navarra
- Occupations: CEO of Sanitas; CEO Bupa Europe and Latin America
- Predecessor: Iñaki Ereño

Iñaki Peralta (Pamplona, 1973) is an economist specializing in healthcare management. He was Chief Executive Officer of Sanitas and Chief Executive Officer of Bupa for Europe and Latin America between 2021 and 2025.

== Career ==
A graduate in Economics from the University of Navarra, he completed his training with the Advanced Management Program at Wharton Business School (University of Pennsylvania).

He has spent a large part of his professional life at Sanitas, a Spanish company that belongs to the international healthcare group Bupa (British United Provident Association). He joined the company in 1997 as managing director of the Sanitas Residencial El Mirador nursing home in Pamplona. Between 1997 and 2006 he held several managerial responsibilities at Sanitas Mayores, including director of operations. He was the territorial director of Sanitas Seguros in northeastern Spain between 2006 and 2008, and general director of Sanitas Hospitales between 2008 and 2013. During this period, he acquired several hospitals that consolidated the group's hospital network.

In 2012 he joined the Bupa management committee for Europe and Latin America and in 2013 he became general manager of Sanitas Seguros. He also contributed to the insurance distribution agreement with BBVA that brought more than 300,000 of the bank's customers to Sanitas, and carried out a similar operation with Banco Sabadell, and Generali. In 2019, he became general supervisor of Bupa Mexico. In 2021, he was appointed CEO of Sanitas, a position previously held by Iñaki Ereño. In 2025, Peralta resigned and Carlos Jaureguizar took over as CEO of Sanitas and Bupa ELA.
