= Endangered species =

Species of some organisms facing a very high risk of extinction

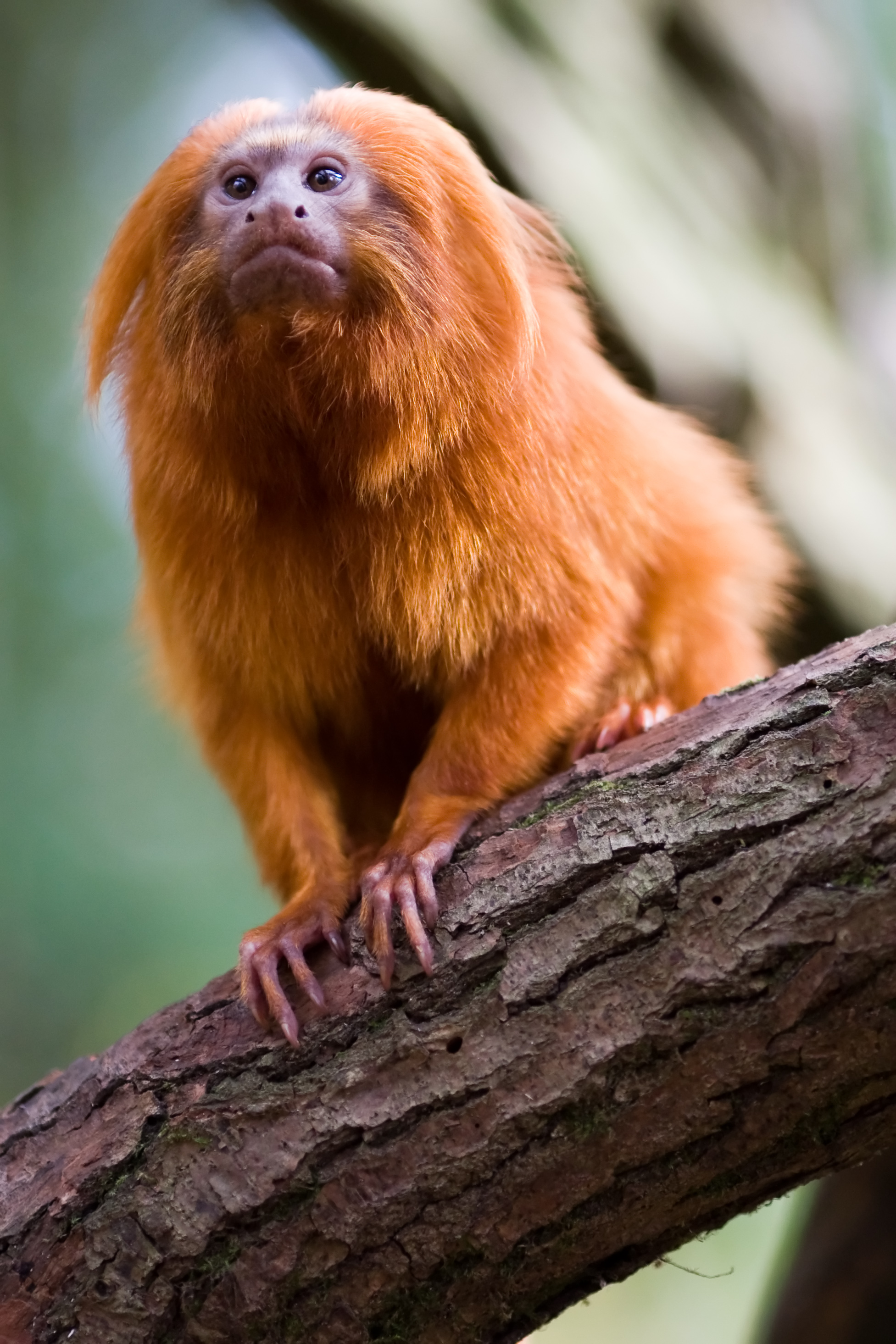
The golden lion tamarin, endemic to Brazil, is an endangered species under protection from extinction

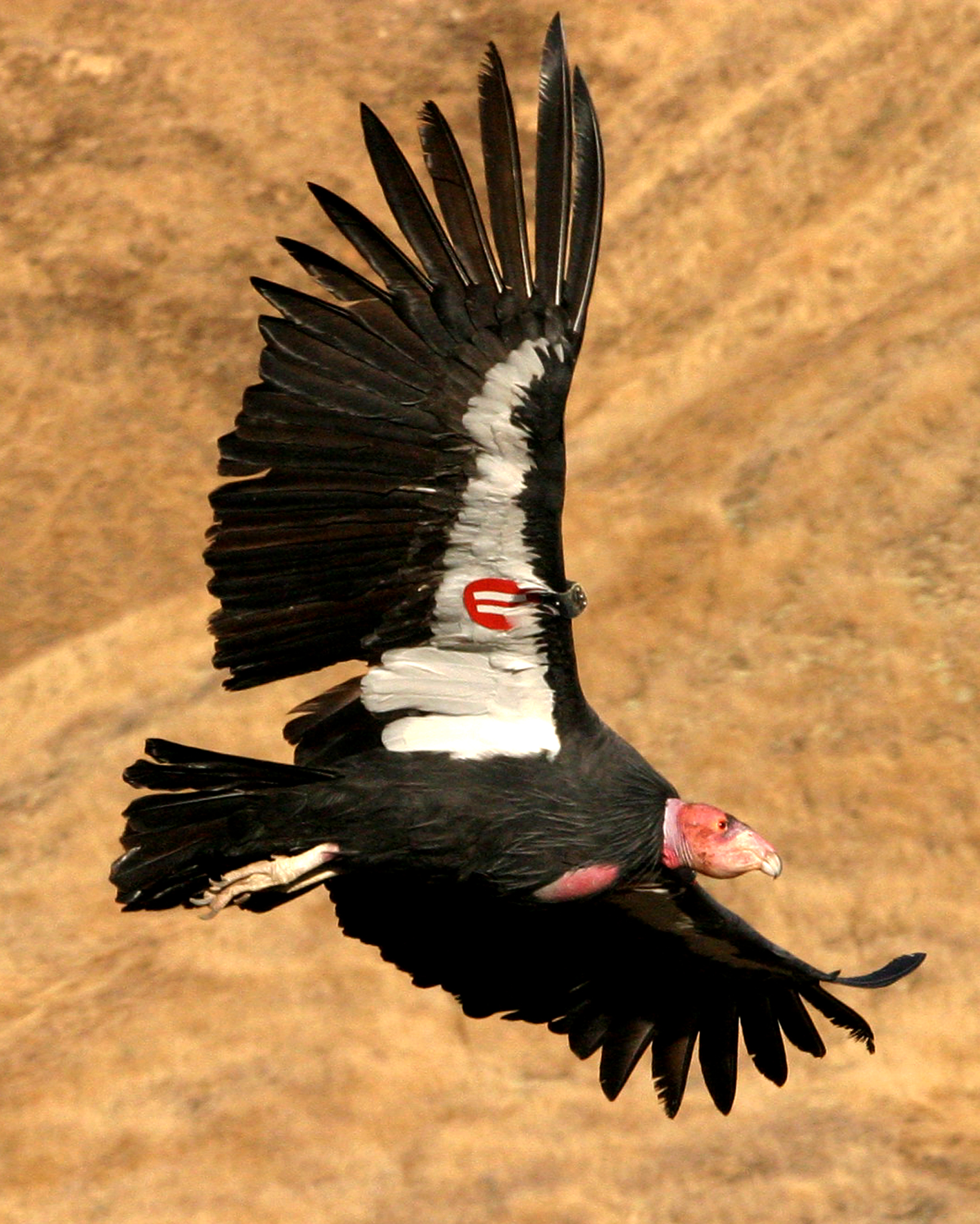
The California condor is a critically endangered species. Note the wing tags used for population monitoring

An endangered species is a species having a very high risk of extinction in the near future, either worldwide or in a particular region. Species become endangered mainly due to habitat depletion and loss of genetic variation.

The International Union for Conservation of Nature (IUCN) Red List classifies the global conservation status of many species, and various other agencies assess the status of species within particular areas. The IUCN considers a species as endangered when it meets one or more criteria for a declining population and diminished geographic distribution; for example, when a species population is reduced by 20% within five years and has fewer than 2,500 mature individuals remaining, the species is considered endangered. In 2026, the IUCN Red List named 49,500 species worldwide as threatened for extinction.

Many nations have laws that protect conservation-reliant species which, for example, forbid hunting or harvesting, restrict land development, or create protected areas. Some endangered species are under protection by extensive conservation efforts, such as captive breeding and habitat restoration. Human activity is a significant factor causing species to become endangered.

== Threat factors ==
A species becomes endangered mainly because of habitat loss and diminished genetic variation.

=== Loss of habitat ===
Habitat loss can occur naturally or as the result of human activity, such as by development of agriculture, food requirements, housing, or industry, and their collective impacts on the environment.

Climate change refers to long-term changes in weather patterns causing shifts in surface temperature and rainfall. Climate change endangers species because it disturbs their native ecosystems. Efforts to understand and mitigate the impact of climate change on species through scientific research, modelling, and conservation evaluate the current condition of species, their genetic variation, and how changes in their environment may affect their survival.

Habitat loss can also occur by introduction of an invasive species.

=== Loss of genetic variation ===
A diversity of traits within a species is its genetic variation, enabling a species to make durable adaptations to habitat changes; typically, genetic variation is highest in species with a large population. Genetic variation is diminished in endangered species with reduced populations by inbreeding, disease, human activity, monoculture, and climate change.

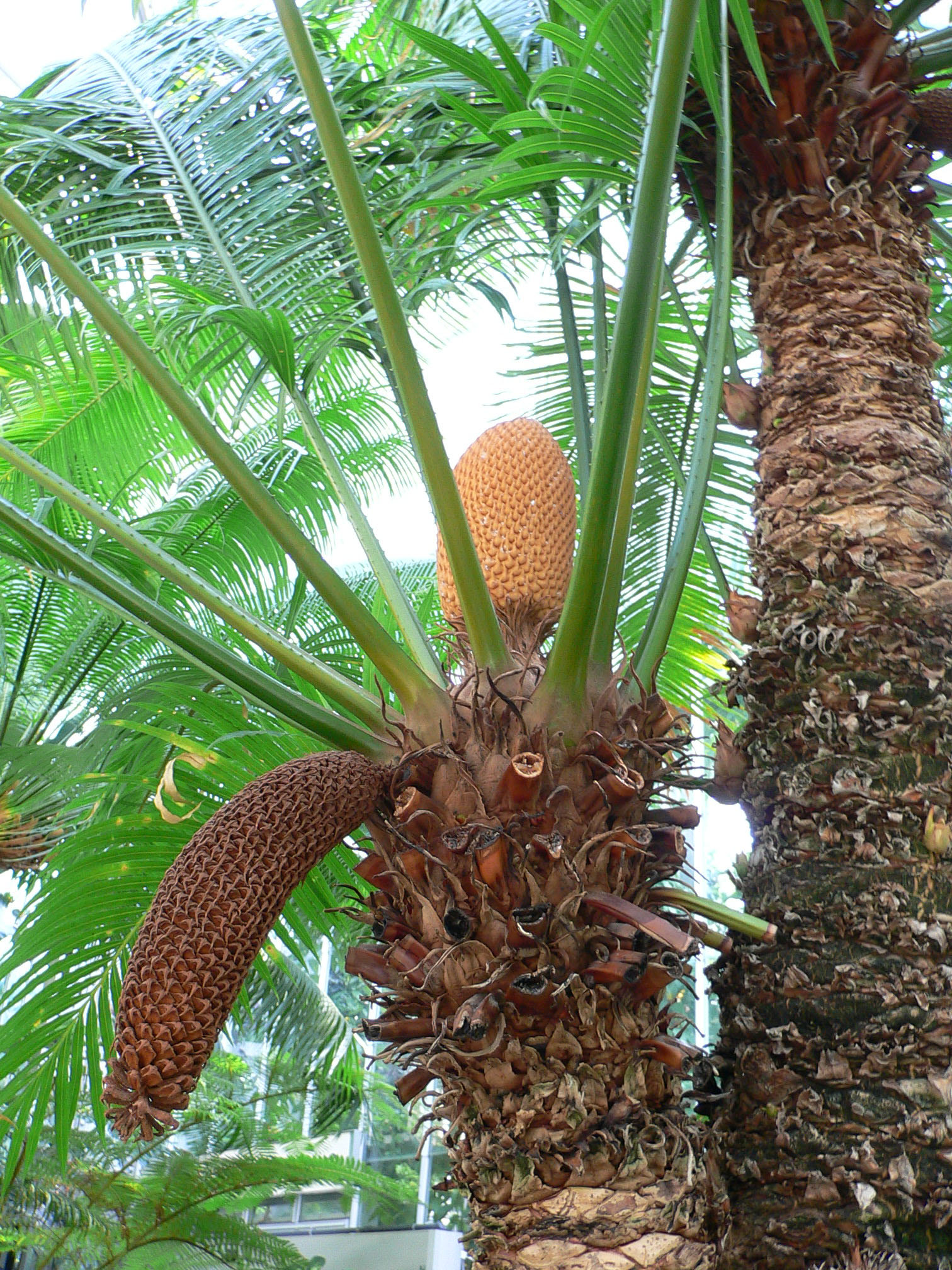
Cycas circinalis, a cycad in the genera of tropical plants endangered in many world regions

== Criteria for endangered species ==
According to the IUCN Red List, a species may become endangered when it meets one or more of several criteria:

- Population decline. A species is endangered when its population diminishes by 50% to 70%, an assessment made over 10 years or three generations, whichever is longer.
- Geographic range. The extent of occurrence of an endangered species is less than 5,000 square kilometres (1,930 square miles), and it occupies an area less than 500 square kilometres (193 square miles).
- Population size. A species is endangered when its population declines by 20% within five years and there are fewer than 2,500 mature individuals remaining.
- Population restrictions. When a species population is reduced to 250 mature individuals, it is classified as endangered.
- Probability of extinction. In the wild, a species has a probability of extinction when its population is reduced to at least 20% within 20 years or five generations.

== Conservation status ==
The conservation status of a species indicates the likelihood that it will become extinct. Multiple factors are considered when assessing the status of a species, such as the number remaining, the overall increase or decrease in the population over time, breeding success rates, or known threats. The IUCN Red List of Threatened Species is the best-known worldwide conservation status listing and ranking system. Species are classified by the IUCN Red List into nine groups set through criteria such as rate of decline, population size, area of geographic distribution, and degree of population and distribution fragmentation.

Also included are species that have gone extinct since 1500 CE. When discussing the IUCN Red List, the official term "threatened" is a grouping of three categories: critically endangered, endangered, and vulnerable.

- Extinct (EX) – There are no known living individuals
- Extinct in the wild (EW) – Known only to survive in captivity, or as a naturalized population outside its historic range
- Critically Endangered (CR) – Highest risk of extinction in the wild
- Endangered (EN) – Higher risk of extinction in the wild
- Vulnerable (VU) – High risk of extinction in the wild
- Near Threatened (NT) – Likely to become endangered in the near future
- Conservation Dependent (CD) – Low risk; is conserved to prevent being near threatened, certain events may lead it to being a higher risk level
- Least concern (LC) – Very low risk; does not qualify for a higher risk category and not likely to be threatened in the near future. Widespread and abundant taxa are included in this category.
- Data deficient (DD) – Not enough data to make an assessment of its risk of extinction
- Not evaluated (NE) – Has not yet been evaluated against the criteria.

Over 50% of the world's species are estimated to be at risk of extinction, but the frontiers between categories such as "endangered", "rare", or "locally extinct" species are often difficult to draw given the general paucity of data on most of these species. This is notably the case in the world's oceans, where distances are vast and endangered species not seen for decades may go extinct unnoticed.

Internationally, 195 countries have signed an accord to create Biodiversity Action Plans that will protect endangered and other threatened species. In the United States, such plans are usually called Species Recovery Plans.

== IUCN Red List ==
Though labelled a list, the IUCN Red List is a system of assessing the global conservation status of species that includes "Data Deficient" (DD) species – species for which more data and assessment is required before their situation may be determined – as well species comprehensively assessed by the IUCN's species assessment process. The species under the index include: mammals, birds, amphibians, cycads, and corals. Those species of "Near Threatened" (NT) and "Least Concern" (LC) status have been assessed and found to have relatively robust and healthy populations, though these may be in decline. Unlike their more general use elsewhere, the List uses the terms "endangered species" and "threatened species" with particular meanings: "Endangered" (EN) species lie between "Vulnerable" (VU) and "Critically Endangered" (CR) species. In 2026, the IUCN Red List identified 49,500 species worldwide as threatened to become extinct. The threatened list includes 71% of cycad plants, 44% of reef corals, 41% of amphibians, and 38% of sharks and rays, among others.

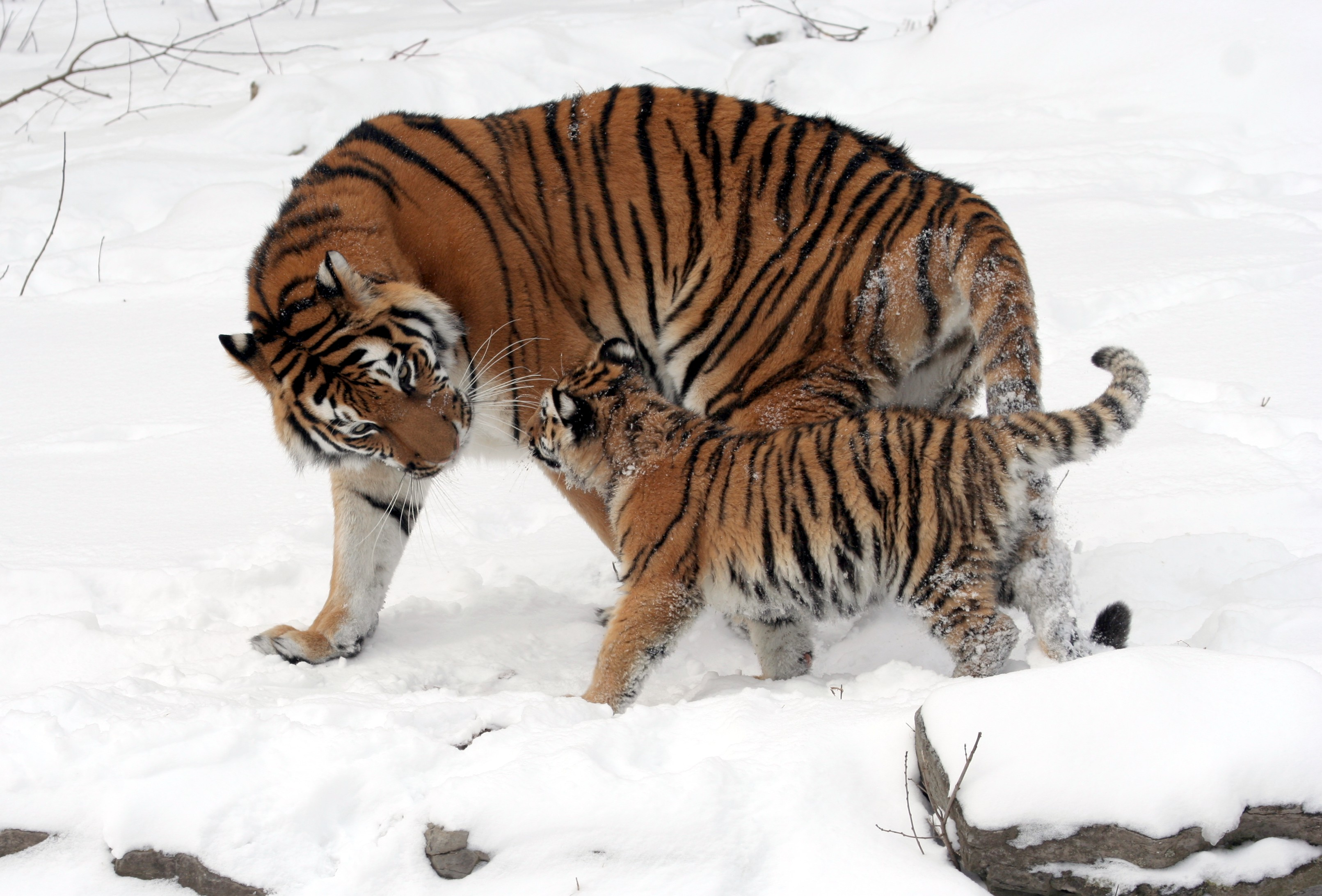
The Siberian tiger is an Endangered (EN) tiger subspecies. Three tiger subspecies are already extinct (see List of carnivorans by population).

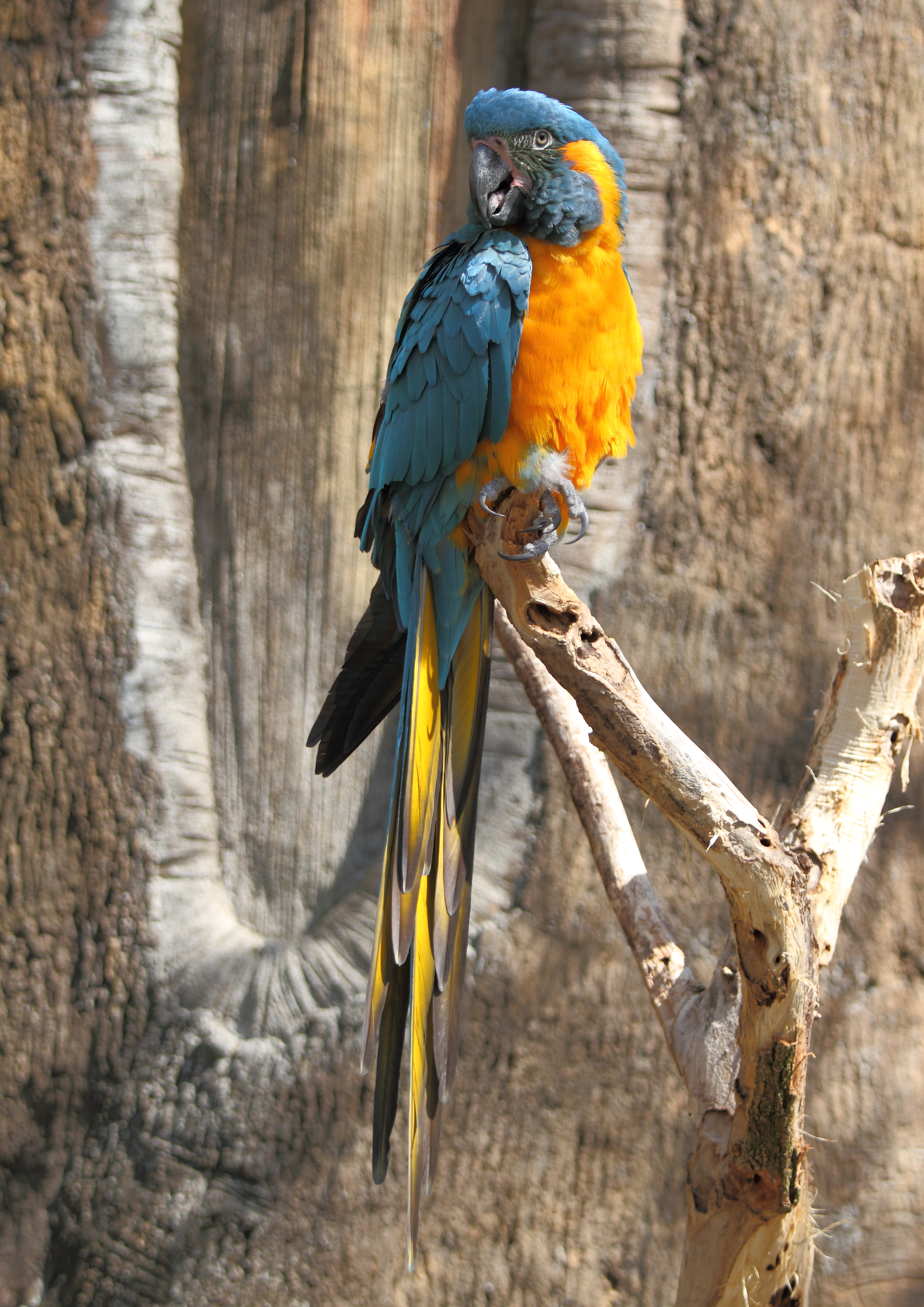
Blue-throated macaw, a critically endangered bird

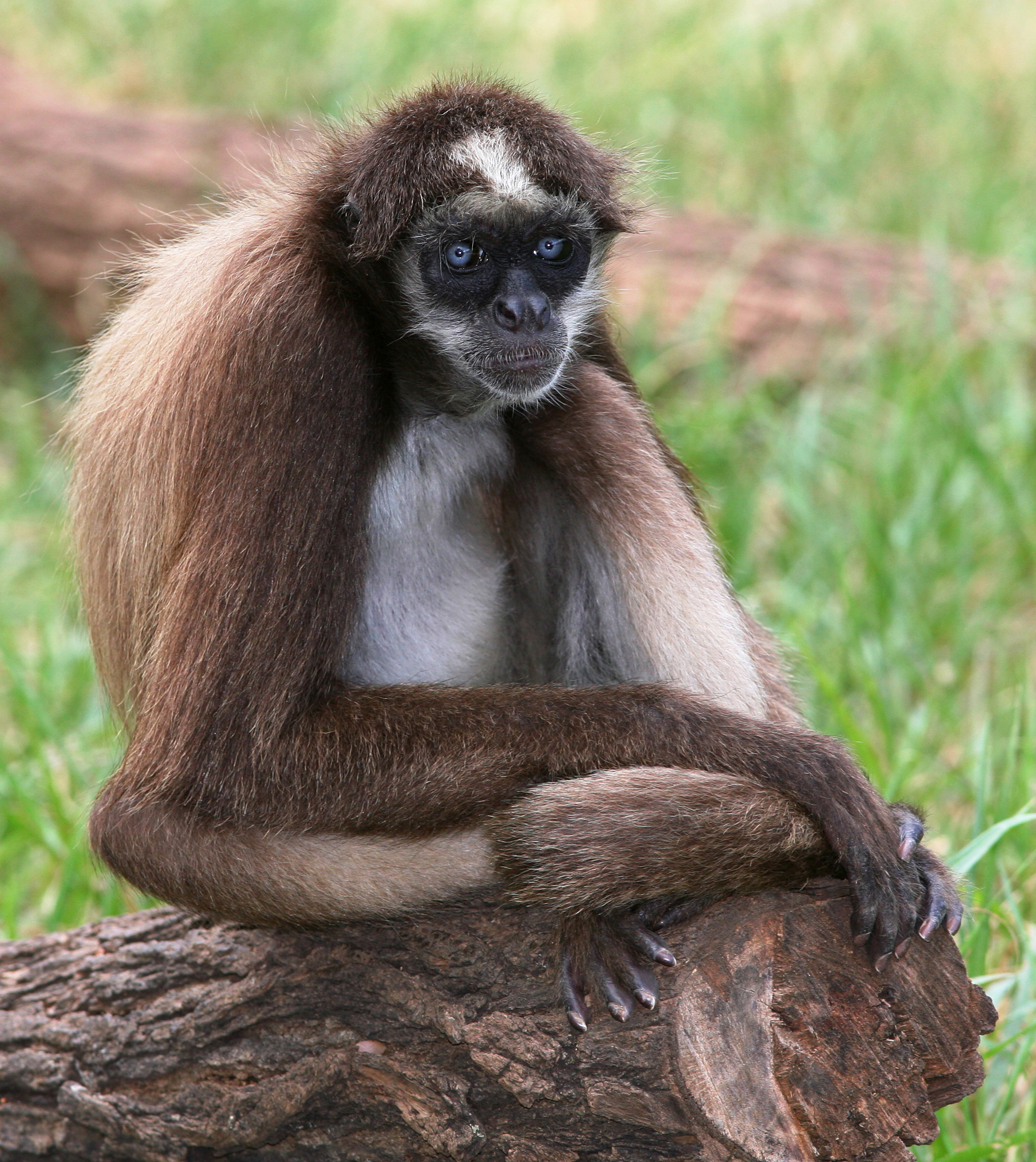
Brown spider monkey, a critically endangered mammal

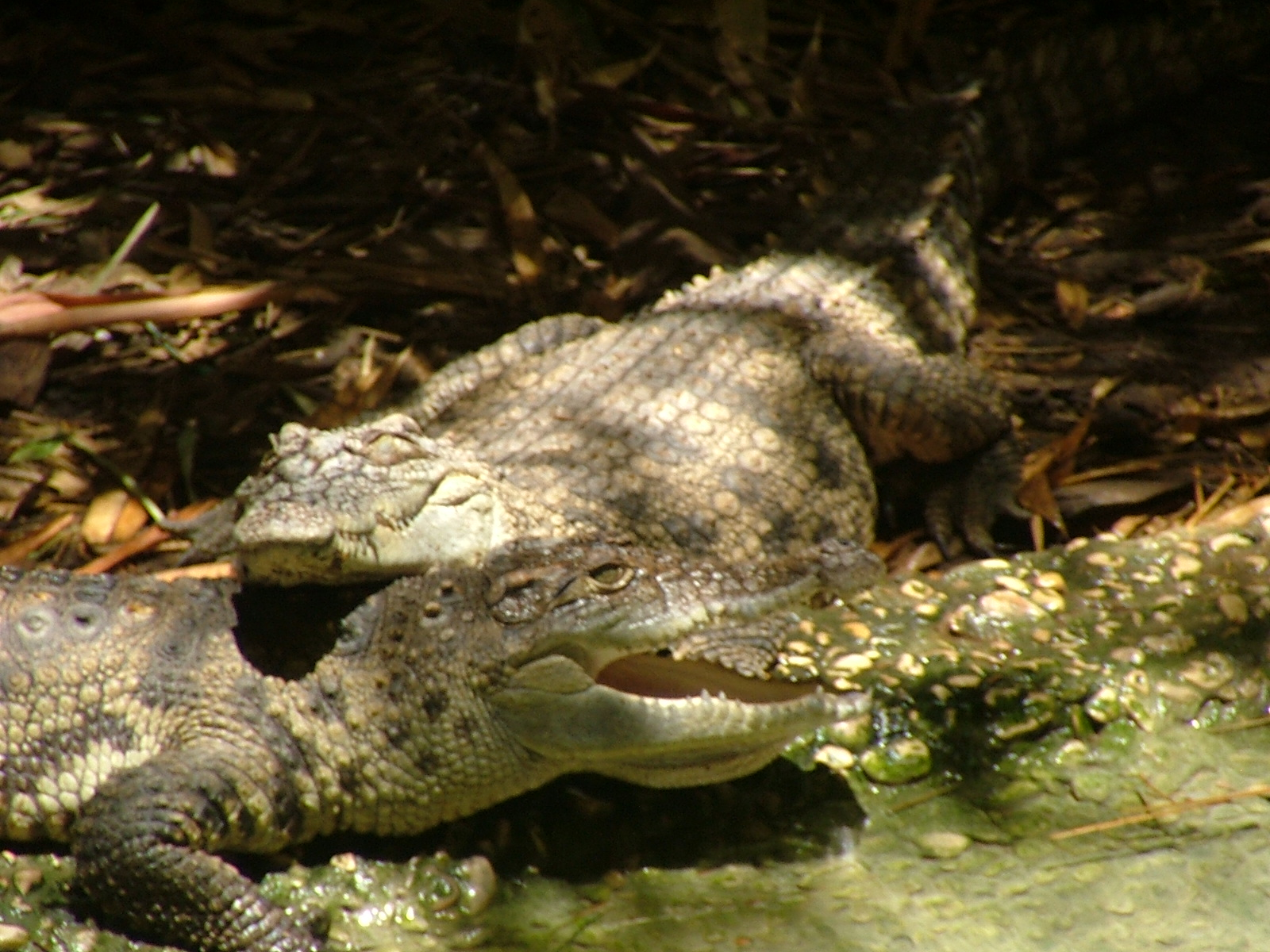
Siamese crocodile, a critically endangered reptile

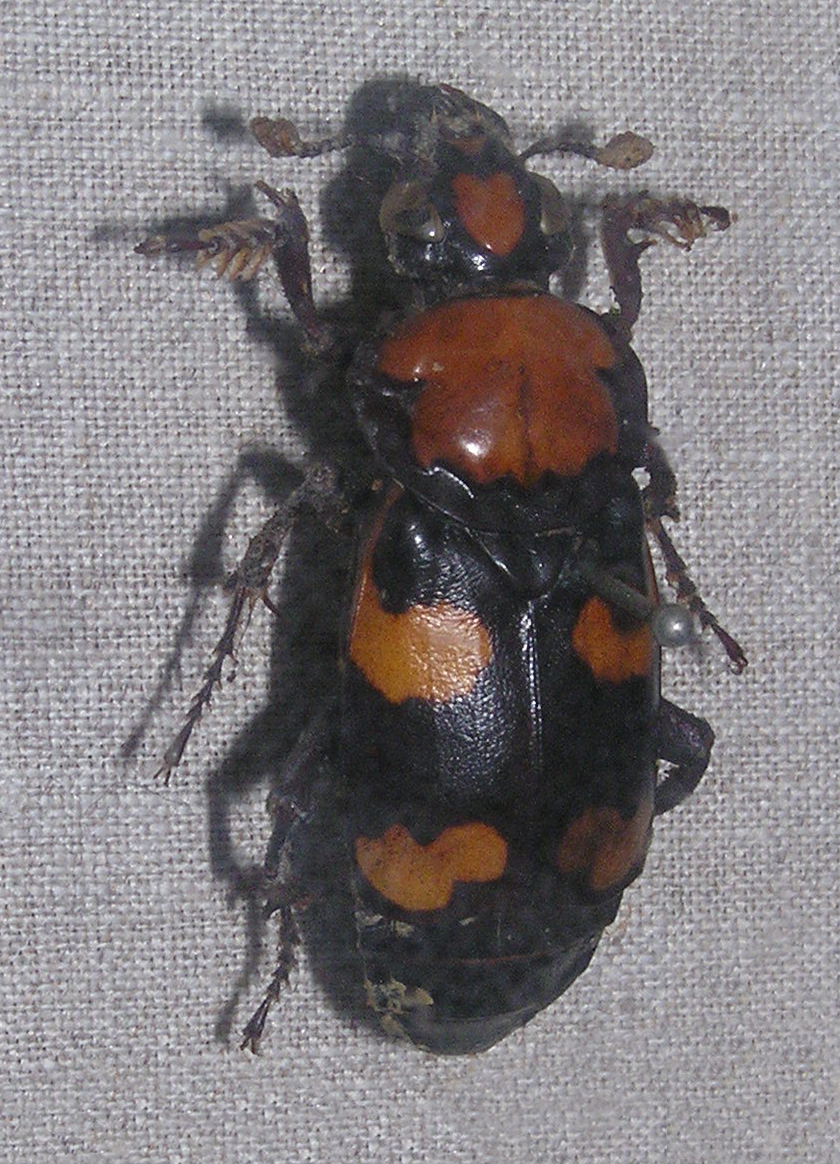
American burying beetle, an endangered species of insect

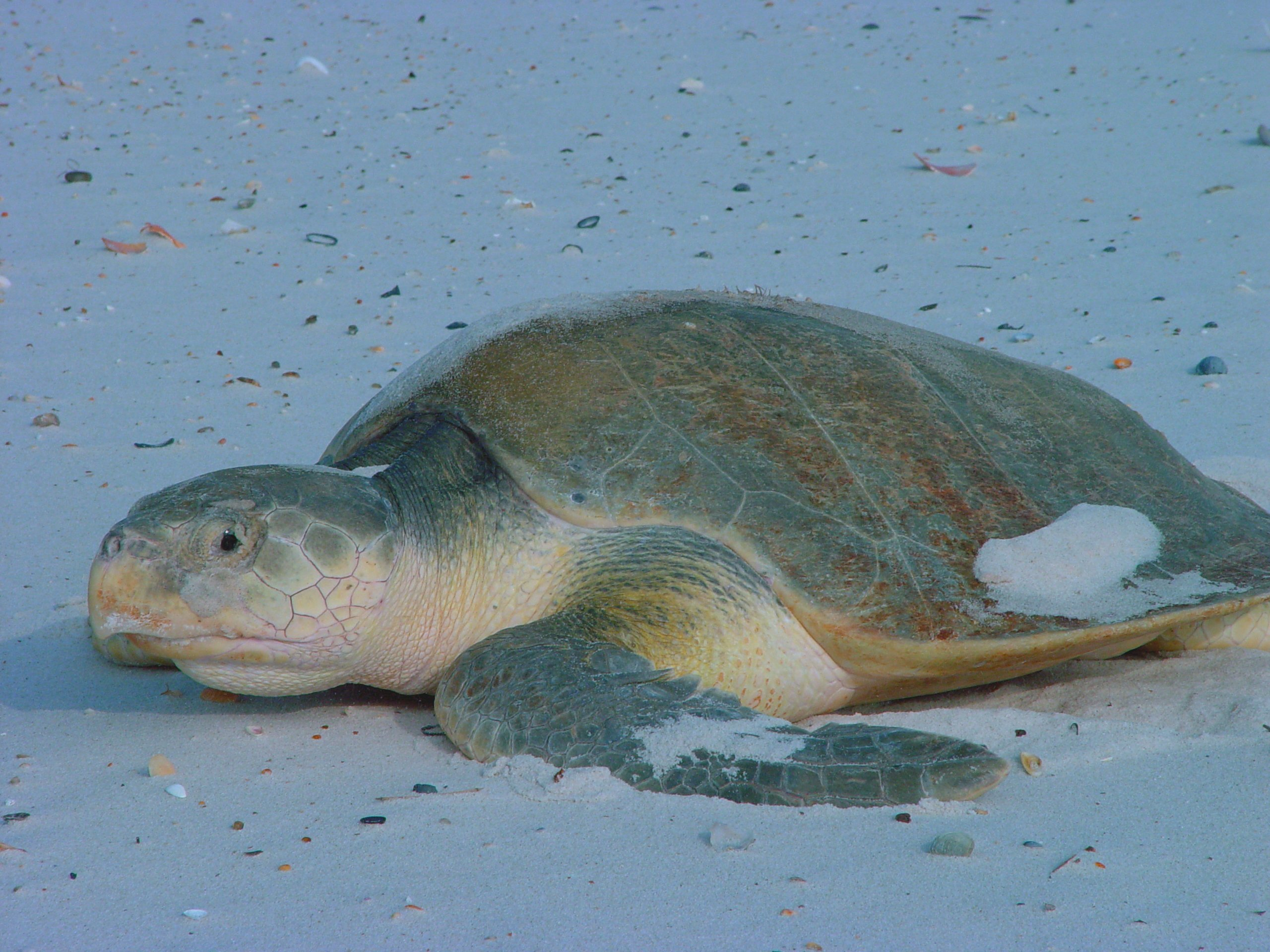
Kemp's ridley sea turtle, a critically endangered reptile

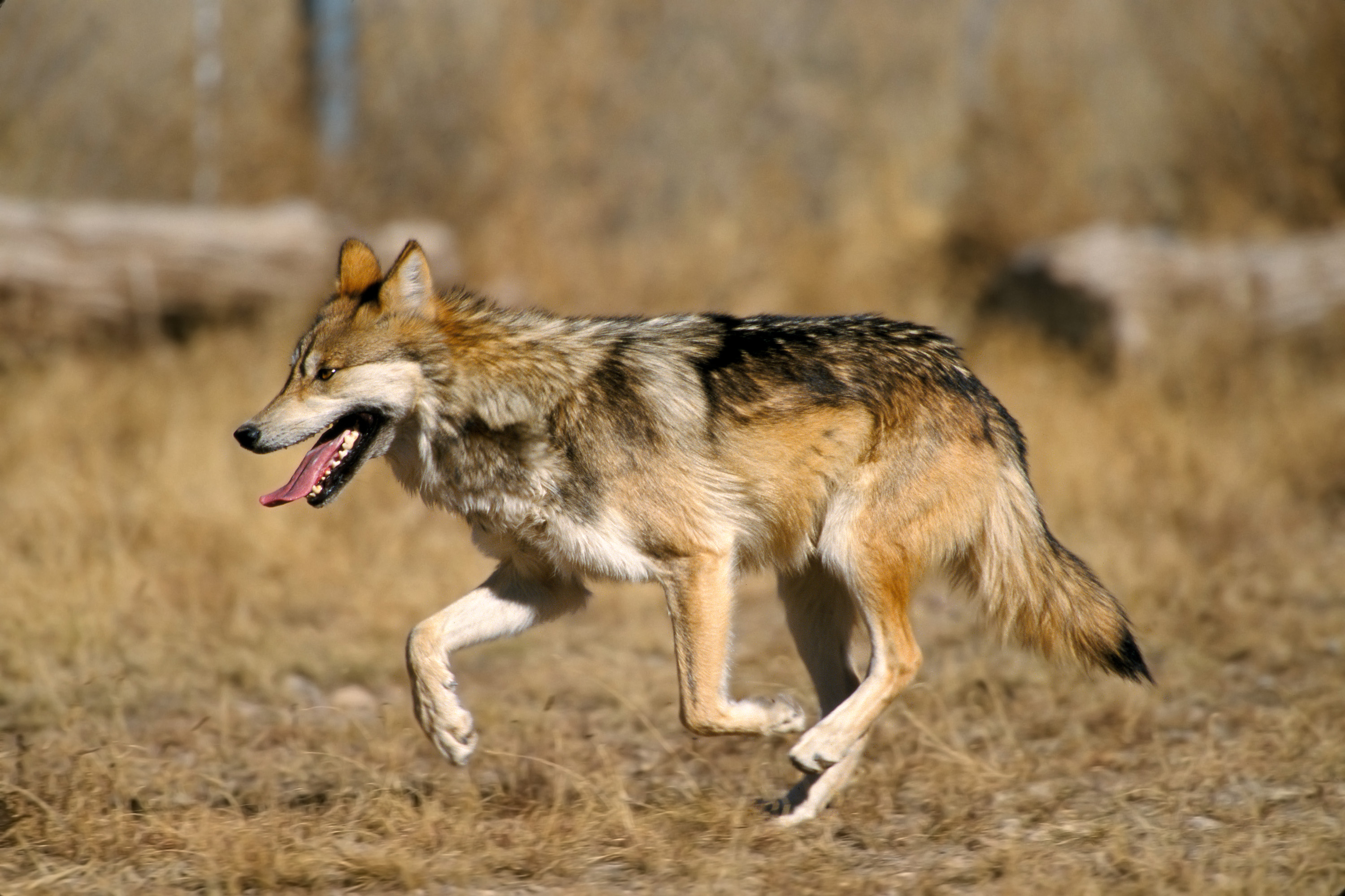
The Mexican wolf, the most endangered subspecies of the North American grey wolf. Approximately 143 are living in the wild.

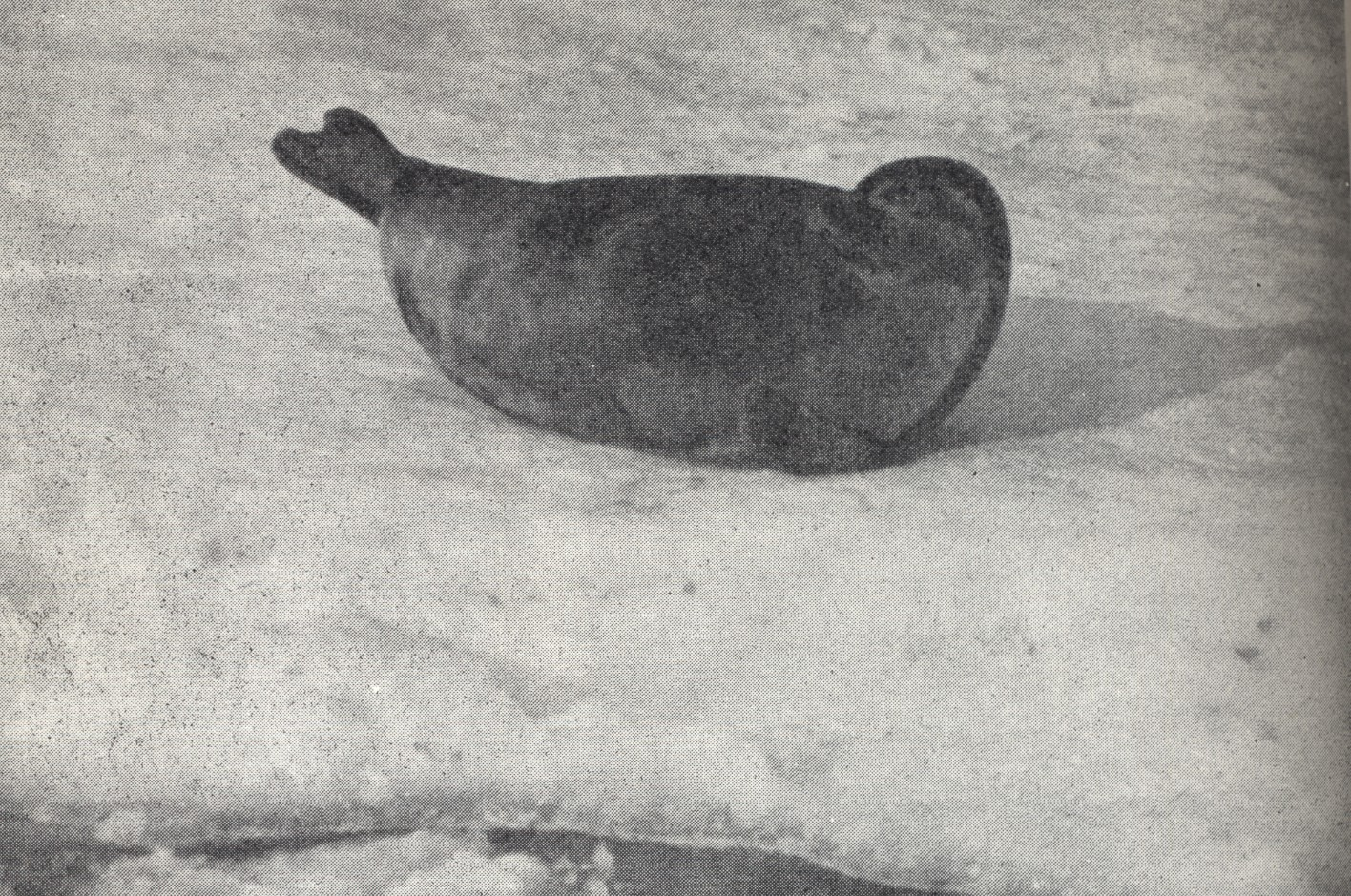
Pusa hispida saimensis, also known as Saimaa ringed seal, from 1956. Living only in Lake Saimaa, Finland, Saimaa ringed seals are among the most endangered seals in the world, having a total population of only about 400 individuals.

== In Brazil ==
A visual representation of the declining percentages of endangered plant and animal species in Brazil from 2014 to 2022. The sidebar graph highlights the contrast between plant and animal conservation efforts.

Brazil is one of the most biodiverse countries in the world, if not the most. It houses not only the Amazon forest but the Atlantic forest, the savanna-like Cerrado among other biomes. Due to the high density of some of its well-preserved rainforests, wildlife trafficking, which along with deforestation is one of the biggest endangerment drivers in Brazil, has become a challenge. Brazil has a broad legal system meant to protect the environment, including its Constitution, as well as several federal, state and local government agencies tasked with protecting the fauna and flora, fining individuals or companies linked to environmental crimes and confiscating illegally taken wildlife. Though such agencies can collect their data, each system operates relatively on its own when it comes to wildlife trafficking. However, both the agencies and the NGO's working in Brazil agree that the birds account for about 80% of trafficked species in the country.

The relation between wildlife smuggling, other environment crimes under the Brazilian law such as deforestation, and endangered species is particularly intricate and troubling since the rarer the animal or plant gets the most targeted and valuable they become in the black market, which leads to more endangered species in its turn.

Additionally, some environment experts and scientists point to the disbanding of environment agencies and the repeal of laws in Brazil under the presidency of Jair Bolsonaro as one of the reasons behind a surge in the number of endangered species. In one occasion during his presidency some fines totalling US$6.7 billion on environment criminals were revoked and at least one fine (related to illegal fishing) imposed on Bolsonaro himself was cancelled and the agent who fined him was demoted.

In the past, Brazil has successfully saved the endemic golden lion tamarin from extinction. Massive campaigns to raise awareness among people by NGO's and governments, which included printing depictions of the golden lion tamarin in the 20 reais Brazilian banknotes (still in circulation), are credited with getting the species out of the critically endangered animals list.

== In the United States ==
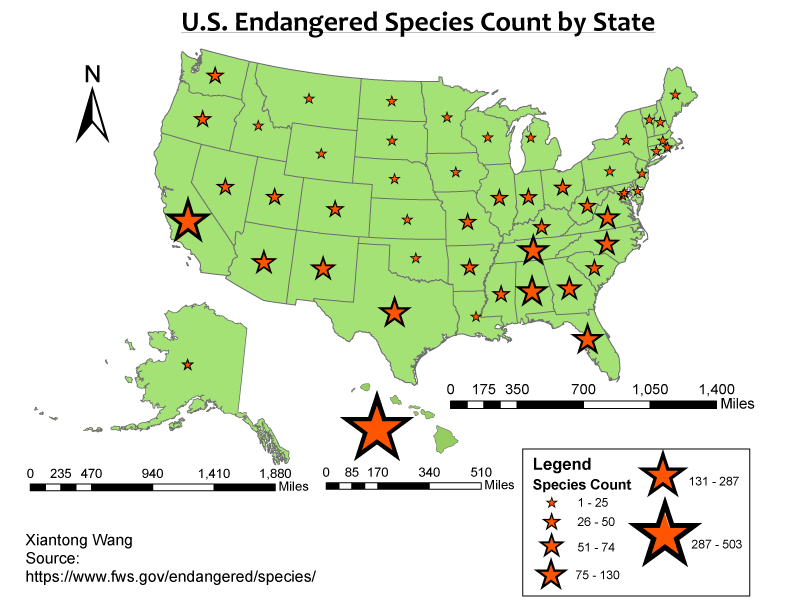
A proportional symbol map of each state's endangered species count

There is data from the United States that shows a correlation between human populations and threatened and endangered species. Using species data from the Database on the Economics and Management of Endangered Species database and the period that the Endangered Species Act (ESA) has been in existence, 1970 to 1997, a table was created that suggests a positive relationship between human activity and species endangerment.

=== Endangered Species Act ===
Under the Endangered Species Act of 1973 in the United States, species may be listed as "endangered" or "threatened". The Salt Creek tiger beetle is an example of an endangered subspecies protected under the ESA. The US Fish and Wildlife Service, as well as the National Marine Fisheries Service are held responsible for classifying and protecting endangered species. They are also responsible for adding a particular species to the list, which can be a long, controversial process. The act adds numerous other provisions as well, including the designation of endangered species' critical habitats and a requirement to develop a recovery plan for the species. On top of this, the ESA protects endangered species from government policies; for instance, federal agencies must consult the Fish and Wildlife Service or the National Marine Fisheries Service before executing any action that may jeopardize threatened species or their habitats.

Some endangered species laws are controversial. Typical areas of controversy include criteria for placing a species on the endangered species list and rules for removing a species from the list once its population has recovered. Whether restrictions on land development constitute a "taking" of land by the government; the related question of whether private landowners should be compensated for the loss of uses of their areas; and obtaining reasonable exceptions to protection laws. Also lobbying from hunters and various industries like the petroleum industry, construction industry, and logging, has been an obstacle in establishing endangered species laws.

The Bush administration lifted a policy that required federal officials to consult a wildlife expert before taking actions that could damage endangered species. Under the Obama administration, this policy was reinstated.

Being listed as an endangered species can have an indirect negative effect since the perceived increase in rarity could make a species more desirable for collectors and poachers. This effect is potentially reducible, such as in China where commercially farmed turtles may be reducing some of the pressure to poach endangered species.

Another problem with the listing of species is its effect of inciting the use of the "shoot, shovel, and shut-up" method of clearing endangered species from an area of land. Some landowners currently may perceive a diminution in value for their land after finding an endangered animal on it. They have allegedly opted to kill and bury the animals or destroy habitat silently. thus removing the problem from their land, but at the same time further reducing the population of an endangered species. The effectiveness of the ESA– which coined the term "endangered species"– has been questioned by business advocacy groups and their publications but is nevertheless widely recognized by wildlife scientists who work with the species as an effective recovery tool. Nineteen species have been delisted and recovered and 93% of listed species in the north eastern United States have a recovering or stable population.

Currently, 1,556 endangered species are under protection by government law. This approximation, however, does not take into consideration the species threatened with endangerment that are not included under the protection of laws like the Endangered Species Act. According to NatureServe's global conservation status, approximately thirteen percent of vertebrates (excluding marine fish), seventeen percent of vascular plants, and six to eighteen percent of fungi are considered imperilled. Thus, in total, between seven and eighteen percent of the United States' known animals, fungi and plants are near extinction. This total is substantially more than the number of species protected in the United States under the Endangered Species Act.

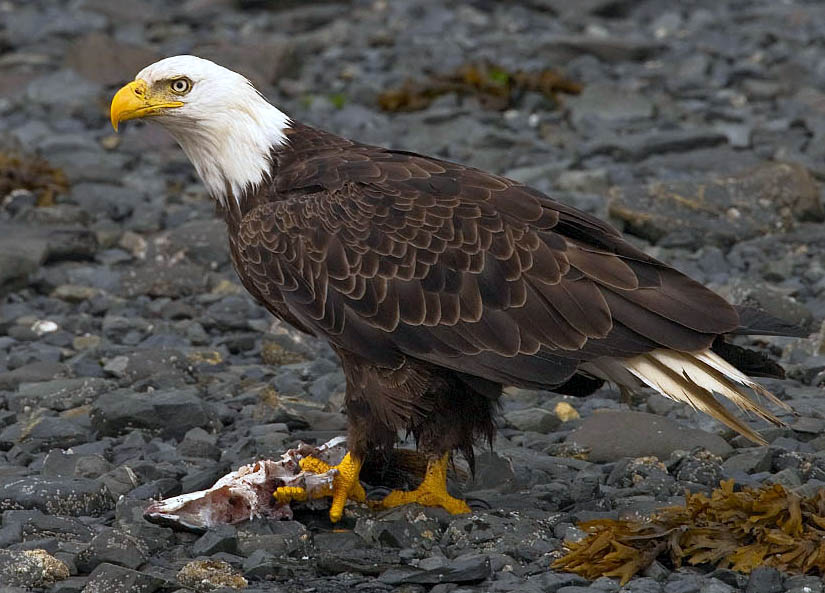
Bald eagle

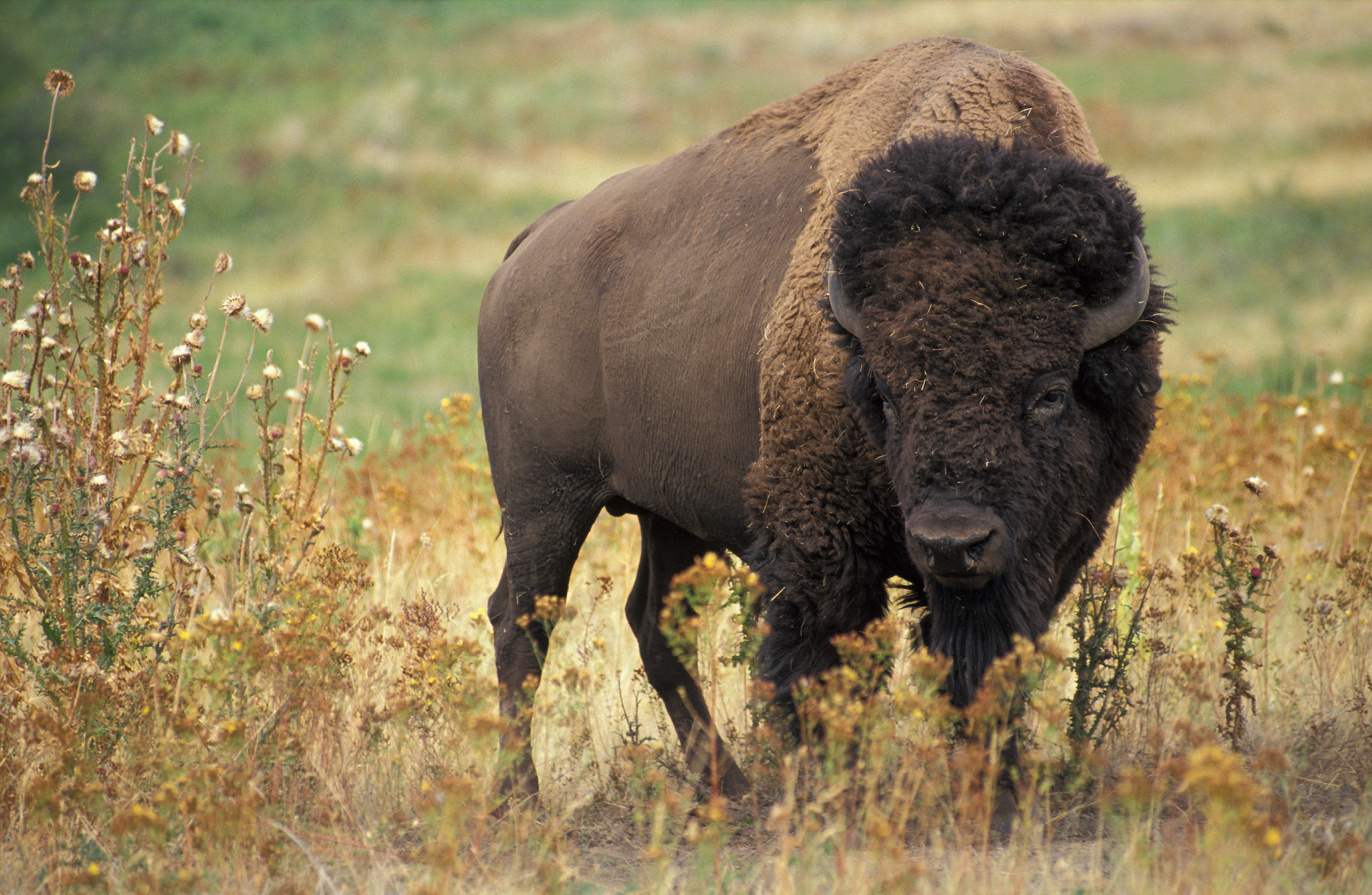
American bison

Ever since humankind began hunting to preserve itself, over-hunting and fishing have been a large and dangerous problem. Of all the species who became extinct due to interference from humankind, the dodo, passenger pigeon, great auk, Tasmanian tiger and Steller's sea cow are some of the more well known examples; with the bald eagle, grizzly bear, American bison, Eastern timber wolf, West African black rhinoceros, ivory belled woodpecker and sea turtle having been poached to near-extinction. Many began as food sources seen as necessary for survival but became the target of sport. However, due to major efforts to prevent extinction, the bald eagle, or Haliaeetus leucocephalus is now under the category of Least Concern on the red list.

A present-day example of the over-hunting of a species can be seen in the oceans as populations of certain whales have been greatly reduced. Large whales like the blue whale, bowhead whale, finback whale, gray whale, sperm whale, and humpback whale are some of the eight whales which are currently still included on the Endangered Species List. Actions have been taken to attempt a reduction in whaling and increase population sizes. The actions include prohibiting all whaling in United States waters, the formation of the CITES treaty which protects all whales, along with the formation of the International Whaling Commission (IWC). But even though all of these movements have been put in place, countries such as Japan continue to hunt and harvest whales under the claim of "scientific purposes". Over-hunting, climatic change and habitat loss leads in landing species in endangered species list. It could mean that extinction rates could increase to a large extent in the future.

== In Canada ==
Endangered species are addressed through Canada's Species at Risk Act. A species is deemed threatened or endangered when it is on the verge of extinction or extirpation. Once a species is deemed threatened or endangered, the Act requires that a recovery plan to be developed that indicates how to stop or reverse the species' population decline. As of 2024, there are 339 Canadian species classified as endangered by the IUCN Red List.

== In India ==
The World Wide Fund-India raises concern in the longevity of the following animal species: the Red Panda, the Bengal Tiger, the Ganges River Dolphin, the Asian Elephant.

India has had significantly high rates of poaching and animal trafficking, threatening many animal species there. Since 1987, over half of trafficked tiger seizures have been within India. The government signed the Wildlife Protection Act and also joined the Convention on the International Trade in 1976, to prevent poaching from harming its wildlife.

== Conservation ==
=== Captive breeding ===
Captive breeding is the process of breeding rare or endangered species in human controlled environments with restricted settings, such as wildlife reserves, zoos, and other conservation facilities. Captive breeding is meant to save species from extinction and so stabilise the population of the species that it will not disappear.

This technique has worked for many species for some time, with probably the oldest known such instances of captive mating being attributed to menageries of European and Asian rulers, an example being the Père David's deer. However, captive breeding techniques are usually difficult to implement for such highly mobile species as some migratory birds (e.g. cranes) and fishes (e.g. hilsa). Additionally, if the captive breeding population is too small, then inbreeding may occur due to a reduced gene pool and reduce resistance.

"Endangered" in relation to "threatened" under the ESA

In 1981, the Association of Zoos and Aquariums (AZA) created a Species Survival Plan (SSP) to help preserve specific endangered and threatened species through captive breeding. With over 450 SSP Plans, some endangered species are covered by the AZA with plans to cover population management goals and recommendations for breeding for a diverse and healthy population, created by Taxon Advisory Groups. These programs are commonly created as a last resort effort. SSP Programs regularly participate in species recovery, veterinary care for wildlife disease outbreaks, and some other wildlife conservation efforts. The AZA's Species Survival Plan also has breeding and transfer programs, both within and outside of AZA – certified zoos and aquariums. Some animals that are part of SSP programs are giant pandas, lowland gorillas, and California condors.

=== Private farming ===
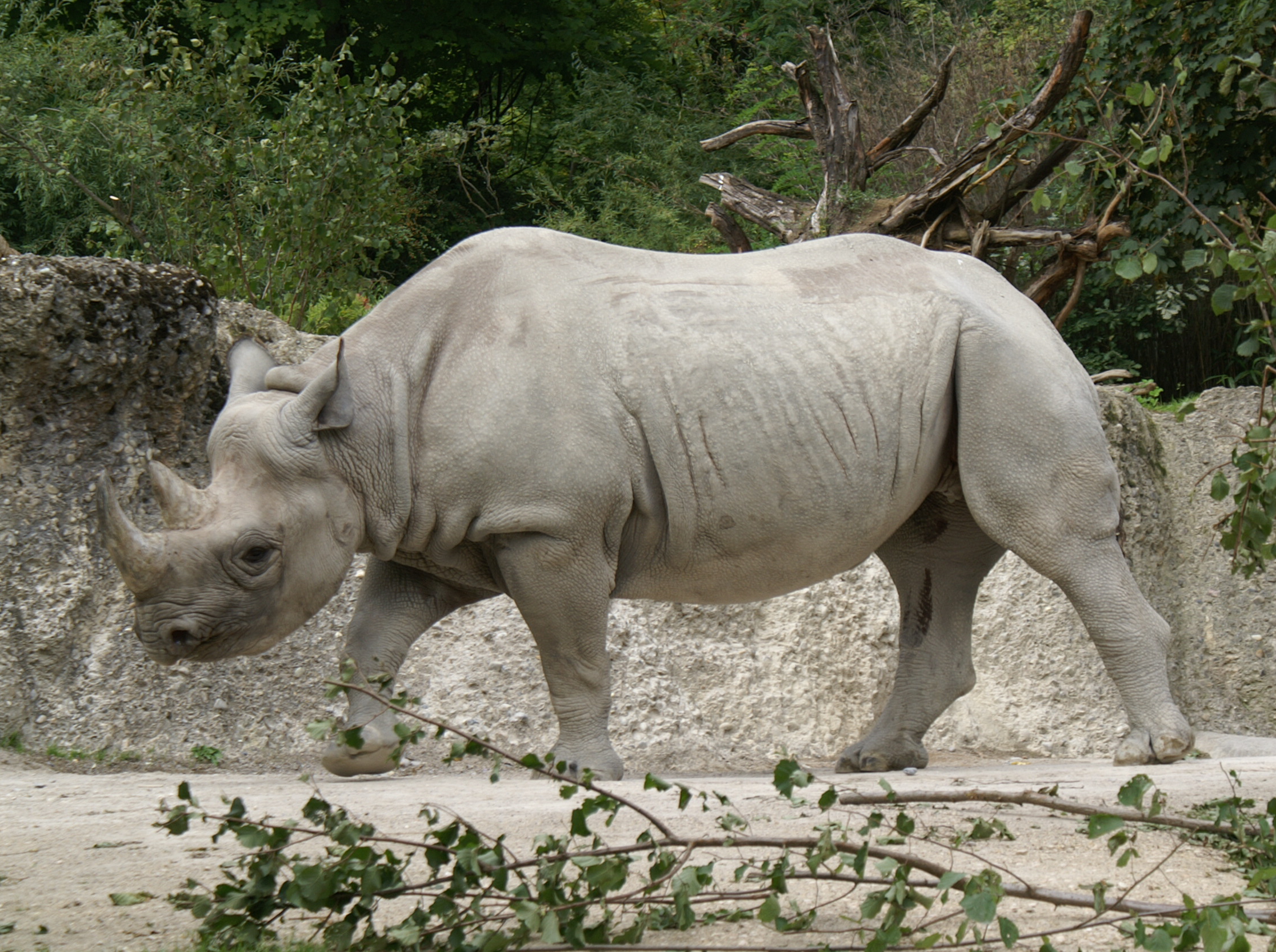
Black rhino

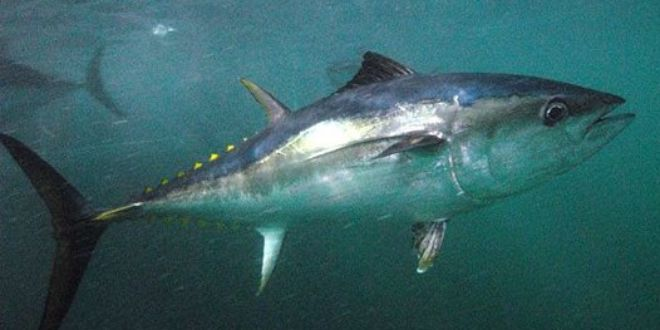
Southern bluefin tuna

Whereas poaching substantially reduces endangered animal populations, legal, for-profit, private farming does the opposite. It has substantially increased the populations of the southern black rhinoceros and southern white rhinoceros. Richard Emslie, a scientific officer at the IUCN, said of such programs, "Effective law enforcement has become much easier now that the animals are largely privately owned... We have been able to bring local communities into conservation programs. There are increasingly strong economic incentives attached to looking after rhinos rather than simply poaching: from Eco-tourism or selling them on for a profit. So many owners are keeping them secure. The private sector has been key to helping our work."

Conservation experts view the effect of China's turtle farming on the wild turtle populations of China and South-Eastern Asia– many of which are endangered– as "poorly understood". Although they commend the gradual replacement of turtles caught wild with farm-raised turtles in the marketplace– the percentage of farm-raised individuals in the "visible" trade grew from around 30% in 2000 to around 70% in 2007– they worry that many wild animals are caught to provide farmers with breeding stock. The conservation expert Peter Paul van Dijk noted that turtle farmers often believe that animals caught wild are superior breeding stock. Turtle farmers may, therefore, seek and catch the last remaining wild specimens of some endangered turtle species.

In 2015, researchers in Australia managed to coax southern bluefin tuna to breed in landlocked tanks, raising the possibility that fish farming may be able to save the species from overfishing.

=== Conservation baselines and proposed paradigm shifts ===
Some scientists have proposed that redefining the baseline for assessing recovery of an endangered species may be necessary as a last resort in the face of extinction, as the increased flexibility provides more realistic recovery goals in the face of extinction. This strategy, however, needs to be pursued with significant care and is typically not considered before attempting recovery within the natural range when possible, due to carrying additional risks and potential unintended consequences. These changes can come in many forms, including relocating a species to a new and better suited habitat, allowing the species to breed with other similar species, or accepting that the modern stable population may be less than it was in the past. An example of these strategies being put into action is through the Florida panther. To save the species, cougars from Texas were introduced, turning a large subset of the panther population into panther–cougar hybrids that were well suited to the environment, facilitating the recovery of the population.

=== Success stories ===
==== Hawaiian monk seal ====
Hawaiian monk seals are one of the most endangered seal species in the world. Conservation initiatives have focused on mitigating human-seal conflicts, rehabilitating injured seals, and extensive monitoring to ensure their survival. These efforts have led to a gradual increase in their population.

==== American bald eagle ====
Once on the brink of extinction in the contiguous United States with only 417 known nesting pairs in 1963 due to pesticide use and habitat destruction, the bald eagle population has made a remarkable recovery. By 2020, the number of nesting pairs had surged to 71,400. Major strategies employed to help raise populations included the provision of eaglets from stable regions to more threatened regions, and major land purchases to act as sanctuaries for the eagles. Thanks to habitat protection, legal protection, and DDT ban efforts, the bald eagle was removed from the list of threatened and endangered species. Though the recovery of the bald eagle population notwithstanding, the species retains significant legal protections in light of its status as the national bird and national symbol of the United States.

==== Gray wolf ====
Starting in 1995 and 1996, 31 gray wolves from western Canada were relocated to Yellowstone, where they were temporarily kept in acclimation pens before being released into the wild. This careful reintroduction aimed to restore a key predator to the ecosystem, which had profound effects on the park's wildlife dynamics. After being nearly eradicated in the lower 48 states by the early 20th century, reintroduction and protective measures have allowed their populations to rebound significantly. By 2017, gray wolves were delisted in Montana, Idaho, and Wyoming, indicating a recovery to a point where they were no longer considered endangered in these areas.

==== Channel Island fox ====
Beginning in 1999, the Channel Islands National Park launched an ambitious recovery program for the island fox, incorporating several strategies: captive breeding and reintroduction, removal of predatory golden eagles, re-establishment of bald eagles, and eradication of non-native ungulates. The U.S. Department of the Interior officially recognized the recovery as the fastest for any Endangered Species Act-listed mammal in the U.S., announcing the delisting of three island fox subspecies in 2016. This recovery, from near extinction in the late 1990s to robust populations by the mid-2010s, underscores the power of partnership-driven conservation.

==== Purple Emperor butterfly ====
The Purple Emperor, native to the UK, has seen a significant comeback in recent years, expanding from southern England to a large portion of the British Isles. Conservation groups have aided this process through the planting of goat willows in many forests, an important food source for the butterfly larvae. The territorial nature of the species makes this process more complicated, requiring many willow trees be planted over a large area, but groups such as Butterfly Conservation have made the recovery process possible.

== Gallery ==
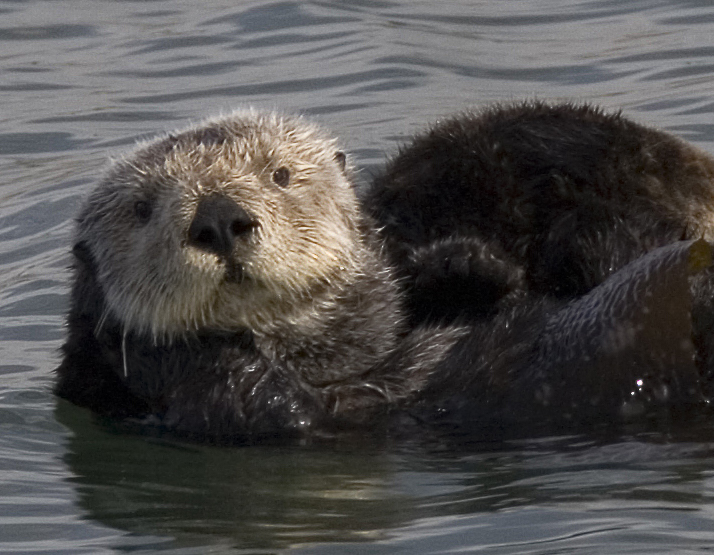
Though endangered, the sea otter has a relatively large population.

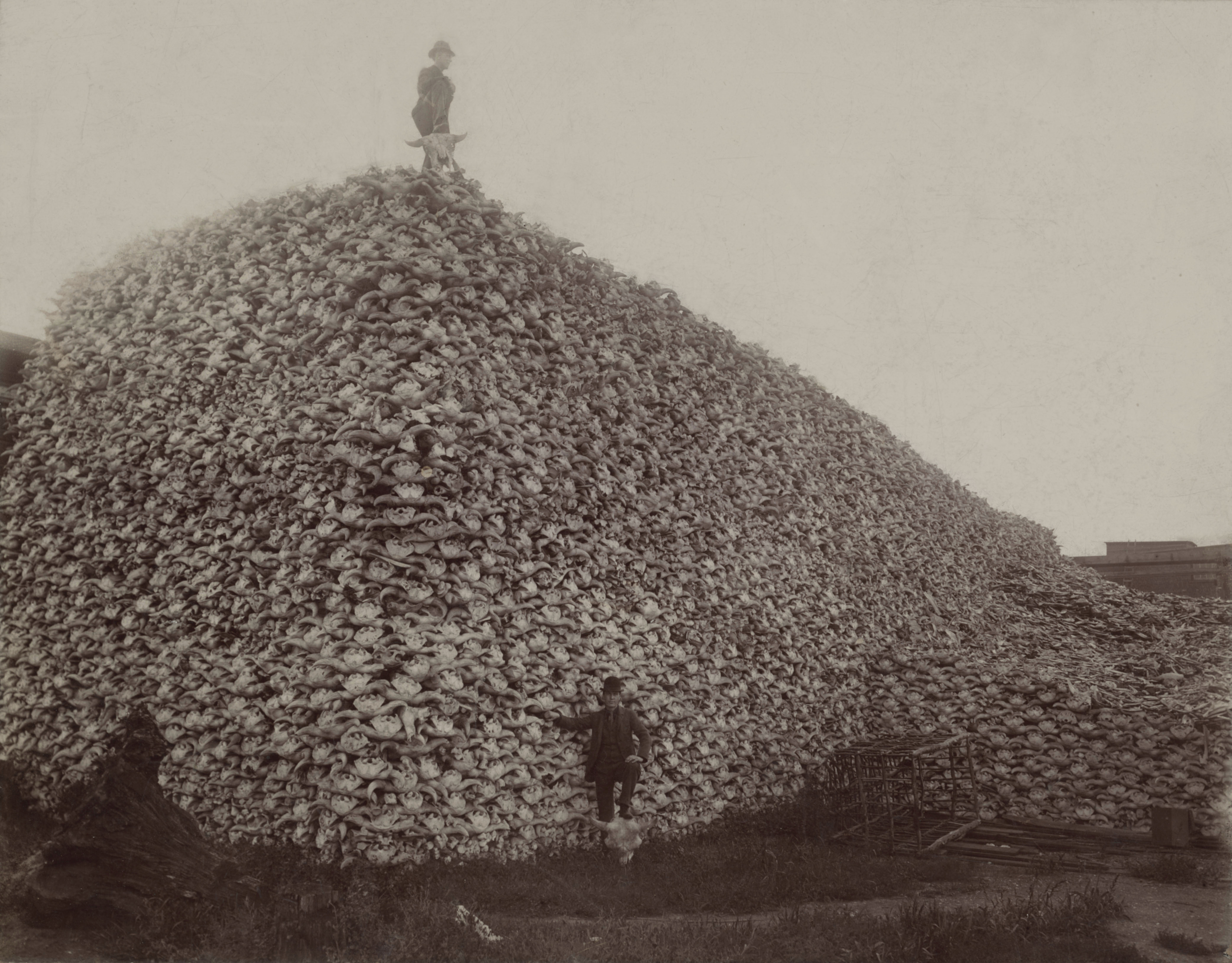
1870s photo of American bison skulls. By 1890, overhunting had reduced the population to 750.

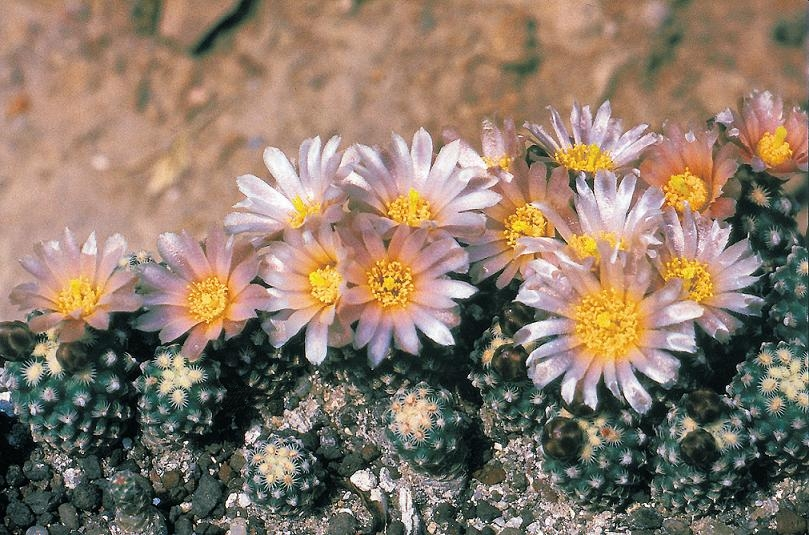
Knowlton cactus

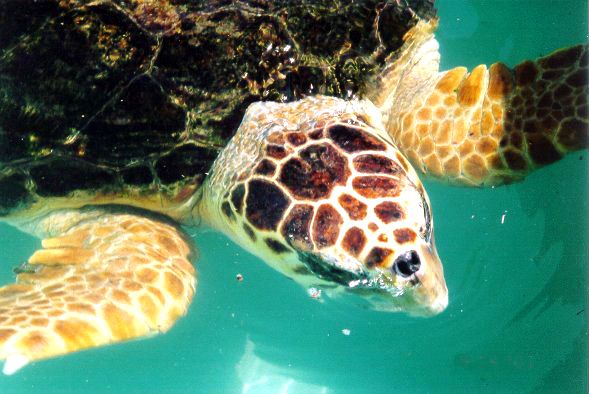
Loggerhead sea turtle

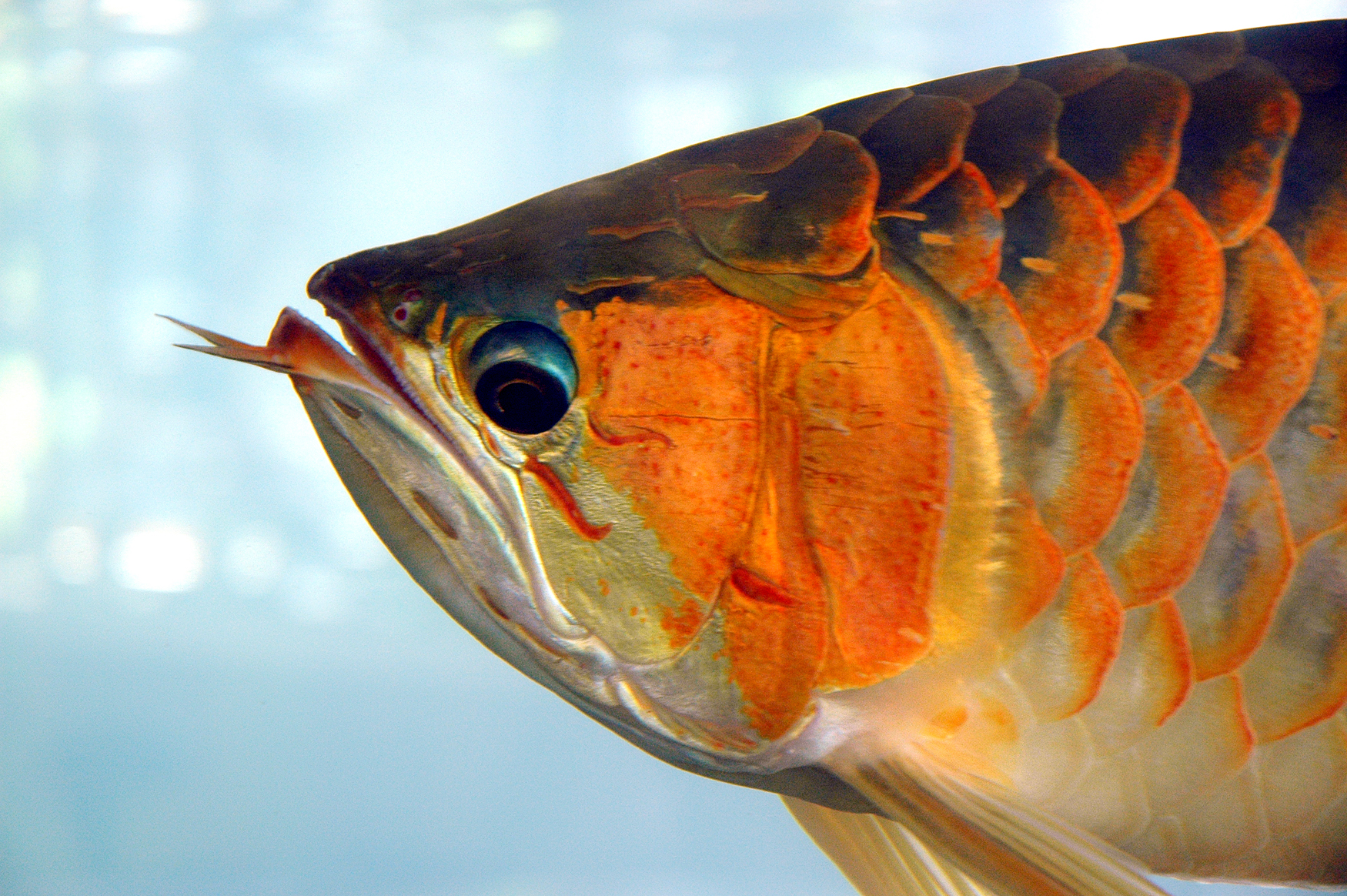
Asian arowana

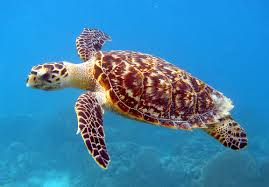
Hawksbill sea turtle

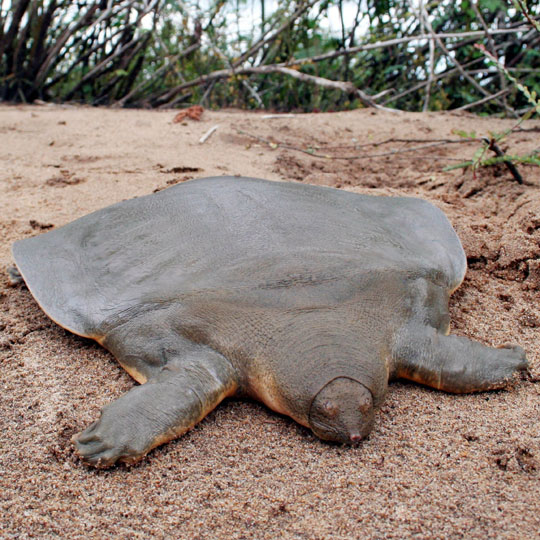
Cantor's giant softshell turtle

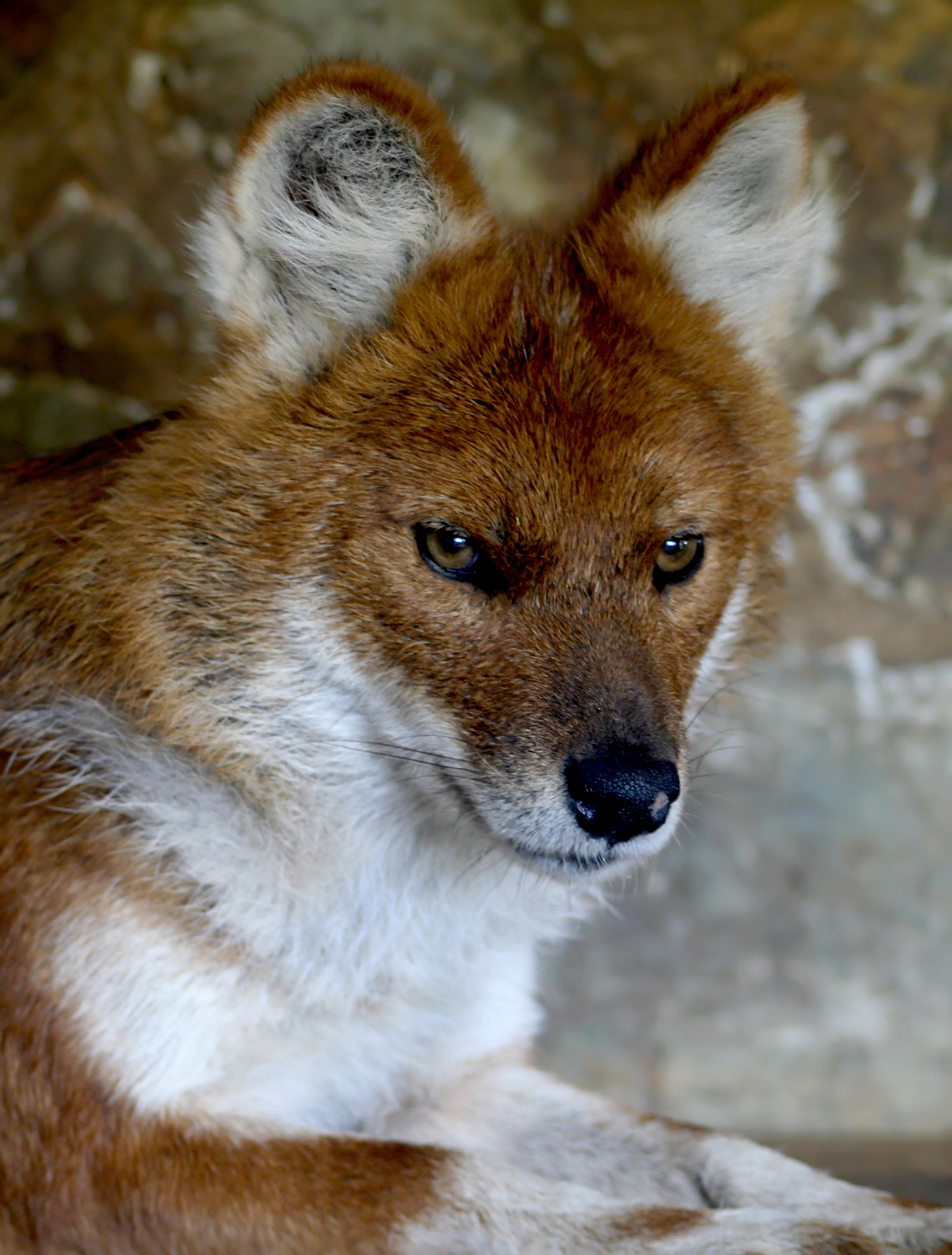
The dhole, Asia's most endangered top predator, is on the edge of extinction.

== See also ==
- ARKive
- Biodiversity
- Center for Biological Diversity
- Conservation cloning
- Critically endangered
- Ex situ conservation
- Genome sequencing of endangered species
- Habitat fragmentation
- Holocene extinction
- International Rhino Foundation
- International Union for Conservation of Nature (IUCN)
- Overexploitation
- Rare species
- Red Data Book of the Russian Federation
- Threatened species
- World Wide Fund for Nature (WWF)

=== IUCN Red List ===
- List of Chromista by conservation status
- List of endangered amphibians
- List of endangered arthropods
- List of endangered birds
- List of endangered fishes
- List of endangered insects
- List of endangered invertebrates
- List of endangered mammals
- List of endangered molluscs
- List of endangered plants
- List of endangered reptiles
- List of fungi by conservation status
- Lists of IUCN Red List endangered species
