= Bupa Arabia =

Saudi health insurance company

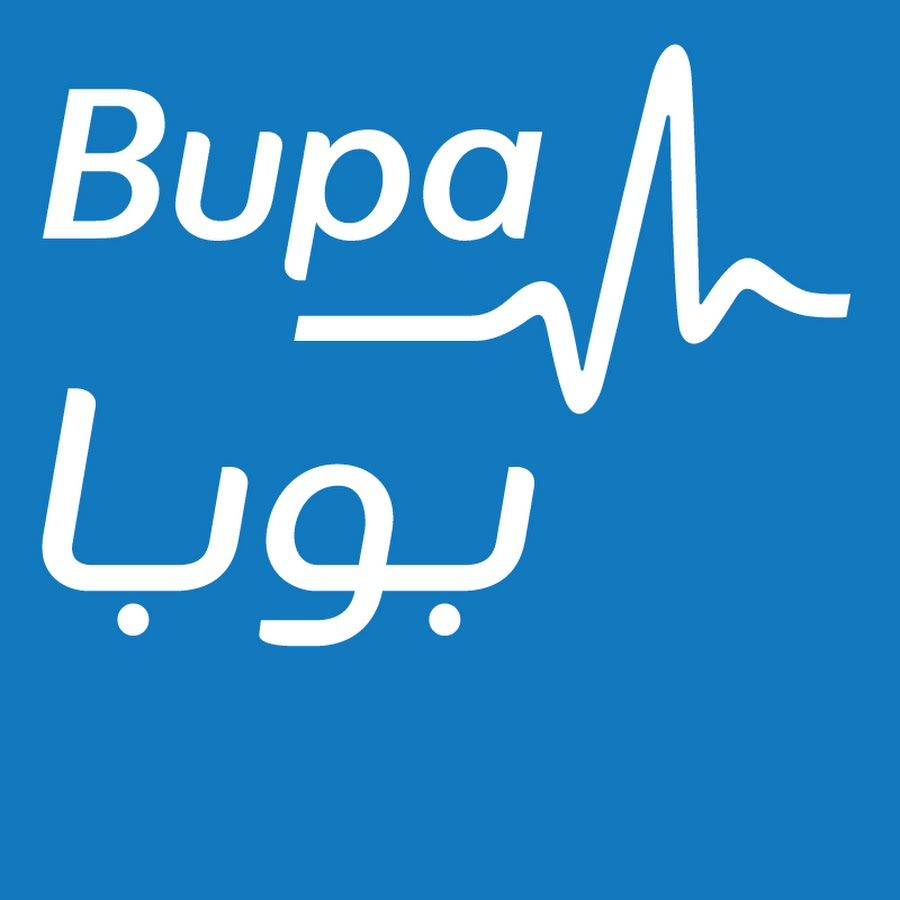
- Company type: Public
- ISIN: SA1210540914
- Industry: Healthcare
- Founded: 1997; 29 years ago
- Headquarters: Jeddah, Saudi Arabia
- Products: Health insurance
- Revenue: 9,503,400,000 Saudi riyal (2019)
- Total assets: 10,181,096,000 Saudi riyal (2019)
- Number of employees: 1300 (2015)
- Website: www.bupa.com.sa

Bupa Arabia (بوبا pronounced /buːpə/) is a Saudi-owned and operated publicly traded company with 800 million Saudi riyals in paid-in capital. Bupa Arabia provides health insurance to the requirements of the Council of Cooperative Health Insurance and the Saudi Arabian Monetary Authority (SAMA).

Bupa Arabia is an associate business of the Bupa Group, a worldwide healthcare organization.

== Background ==
Under insurance regulations, Bupa Arabia evolved its business from a joint venture to a publicly listed company offering cooperative health insurance.

In March 2008, Bupa Arabia went public and listed 40% of its shares for trading on Tadawul. According to Arab News, the IPO was over-subscribed by 921%. The remaining 60% of the shares were divided between BUPA Investments Overseas Co. and Nazer Group.

In 2012, BUPA Investments Overseas Co. acquired Nazer Group's stake in Bupa Arabia.

In 2014, BUPA Investments Overseas Co. acquired a significant stake in The Mediterranean and Gulf Cooperative Insurance and Reinsurance Company (Medgulf) Mediterranean & Gulf Insurance Co. resulting in 55% of the total shares.

== Services ==
=== Bupa Corporate ===
Bupa Corporate is one of the main groups of products that Bupa Arabia has developed for larger businesses and corporations within the Saudi market. The product coverage is based on the basic Council of Cooperative Health Insurance (CCHI) product/policy guidelines and is customized to give a range of options. The available cover levels range from SR 500,000 to SR 37,500,000, and there is a choice of hospital networks. Bupa Corporate includes four main schemes: Gold, Silver, Bronze, and Blue.

=== Bupa Business ===
Bupa Business is a group of products that Bupa Arabia has developed for small to medium businesses and corporations within the Saudi market. The product coverage is based on the basic Council of Cooperative Health Insurance (CCHI) product/policy guidelines, and customized to give a range of options. The available cover levels range from SR 500,000 to SR 600,000, and there is a choice of 7+ hospital networks. Bupa Business includes seven schemes: Diamond, Gold, Silver, Bronze, Blue, Green and White.

=== Bupa for Saudi Families ===
Bupa Family is designed for Saudi families who do not fall under Council of Cooperative Health Insurance (CCHI) enforcement within the Saudi market. The available cover levels range from SR 75,000 to SR 250,000. Bupa Family includes four main schemes: Gold, Silver, Bronze and Blue.

=== Bupa for Individuals ===
Bupa for individuals is designed purely for expatriates working in Saudi Arabia that are not under the sponsorship of a company or establishment. Bupa Individual includes one scheme, Basic Green, which can be purchased through the website.

=== Bupa for Domestic Help ===
Bupa Domestic is designed for domestic workers. This product is designed around the Council of Cooperative Health Insurance (CCHI) guidelines and is available in two schemes: Bronze and White.
