= Niva Bupa =

Indian Health Insurance Company Private Limited

Niva Bupa Health Insurance Company
- Formerly: Max Bupa Health Insurance Company Limited
- Type: Public
- Traded as: NSE: NIVABUPA; BSE: 544286
- Industry: Insurance
- Founded: 2008; 18 years ago
- Headquarters: New Delhi, India
- Area served: India
- Key people: Krishnan Ramachandran (MD and CEO); C. B. Bhave (Chairman)
- Services: Health insurance
- Parent: Bupa (55%)
- Website: nivabupa.com

Niva Bupa Health Insurance Company Limited (Niva Bupa) is an Indian health insurance company, founded in 2008 and headquartered in New Delhi. It is a subsidiary of UK-based health insurance and healthcare company Bupa. The company is regulated by the Insurance Regulatory and Development Authority of India (IRDAI).

== History ==
The company was founded as Max Bupa Health Insurance in 2008 as a 74:26 joint venture between Max India and Bupa, with operations starting in 2010. It distributed its policies through its agents and bancassurance partners.

In 2015, Bupa increased its stake in the company to 49%, after acquiring a 23% stake from Max India for ₹191 crore (US$29.77 million).

In February 2019, Max India's entire 51% stake was acquired by Fettle Tone LLP, an affiliate of Indian private equity firm True North, for ₹510 crore (US$72.42 million).

In 2023, True North announced that it would sell a 20% stake in the company to Bupa for ₹2,700 crore (US$280 million), making Bupa the majority shareholder at 63%.

In November 2024, Niva Bupa went public with an initial public offering and listed on the NSE and BSE, with Bupa continuing as the sole promoter after the IPO with an ownership of over 55%.

== Violations ==
In 2016, the IRDAI imposed a penalty of ₹20 lakh on the company for four violations, one of which pertained to timelines for settling claims.

In October 2026, Delhi HC imposed a nominal cost of ₹1 on the company. the court ruled that the insurance firm misused the jurisdiction of its Intellectual Property Division by filing a lawsuit against a social media influencer over critical online posts concerning the company.

== See also ==
- Insurance in India
