= Bupa =

British company

British United Provident Association Limited
- Type: Company limited by guarantee
- Industry: Health Insurance; Healthcare
- Founded: 1947; 79 years ago
- Headquarters: London, United Kingdom
- Key people: Roger Davis (Group chairman); Iñaki Ereño (Group CEO)
- Services: Health insurance; Healthcare services
- Revenue: ▲$6.41 billion (2024)
- Net income: ▲$414 million (2024)
- Total assets: ▼$20.23 billion (2024)
- Total equity: ▲$9.23 billion (2024)
- Number of employees: 87,132 (2024)
- Website: www.bupa.com

British United Provident Association Limited, trading as Bupa (/buːpə/), is a British multinational health insurance and healthcare company with over 43 million customers worldwide.

Bupa's origins and global headquarters are in the United Kingdom. Its main countries of operation are Australia, Spain, the United Kingdom, Chile, Poland, New Zealand, Hong Kong, Turkey, Brazil, Ireland, Mexico and the United States. It also has a presence across Latin America, the Middle East and Asia, including joint ventures in Saudi Arabia and India.

Bupa is a private company limited by guarantee. It has no shareholders and reinvests its profits.

Health insurance represents 71% of Bupa's revenues worldwide and 24.4 million of its customers. Bupa runs various health provision services for a further 19.2 million customers worldwide (21% of its revenue) including hospitals (primarily in Spain, Poland and Chile), outpatient clinics, dental centres and digital services. Bupa also runs aged care facilities in four countries; the United Kingdom, Australia, Spain and New Zealand, which make up 8% of its revenue.

It was ranked 83rd out of 750 global companies in the 2020 Forbes World's Best Employers List.

== History ==
=== Early history ===
Bupa (originally the British United Provident Association) was established in 1947 when seventeen British provident associations joined to provide healthcare for the general public. The firm is a private company limited by guarantee; it has no shareholders, and any profits (after tax) are reinvested in the business.

The services offered by Bupa began as private medical insurance, offering policies to individuals, companies and other organisations, and eventually expanded to include privately run hospitals, outpatient clinics, health assessments, GP services, dental centres, digital health, aged care and other health services.

=== Growth and international expansion ===
==== 1970s ====
Bupa has expanded internationally from its UK operations. Malta was the site of Bupa's first overseas business in 1971 and it started insurance operations in Hong Kong in 1976.

==== 1980s ====
In 1982, Bupa International was launched to provide worldwide medical cover to people working outside their home country. This business division is now branded as 'Bupa Global'.

In 1989, Bupa acquired 'Sanitas' S.A. de Seguros, Spain's second largest private medical insurer. This has expanded to become a combined health insurance, hospital, clinic, dental and aged care business operating under the Sanitas brand.

==== 1990s ====
During the 1990s, Bupa continued to expand internationally. An insurance business was established in Thailand which was sold in 2017 to Aetna. Bupa Ireland, a health insurance business, was established in 1996 but sold in 2007.

Bupa also diversified in the UK into care homes with the acquisition of 200 homes through Community Nursing Homes, Goldsborough Healthcare Group and Care First Group.

In 1997, Bupa entered the Kingdom of Saudi Arabia in partnership with the Nazer Group to form Bupa Arabia. In 2008, Bupa Arabia was listed on the Tadawul, the Saudi stock market. Bupa Arabia is now the leading health insurance provider in the KSA. Bupa owns 43.25% of this business.

==== 2000–2010 ====
In the 2000s, Bupa entered the Australian health insurance market, opened hospitals in Spain and expanded its network of clinics and care homes in the UK.

In 2007, Bupa completed the sale of its UK hospitals business to Spire Healthcare. Bupa's rationale was that the scale of both its UK hospitals and insurance businesses meant that they were becoming increasingly constrained by being part of the same group.

Significant acquisitions followed. The largest of these was the merger of Bupa's insurance business in Australia with the insurance group MBF to form what was then Australia's second largest private medical insurer. In 2011, Bupa Australia brought together the insurance brands MBF, HBA and Mutual Community under the Bupa brand. Bupa acquired the Amity Group of care homes in Australia in 2007.

In 2010, Bupa launched a partnership in India with Max India Ltd. In 2019, Bupa completed the transition to a new partner, True North, while retaining a 44.42% stake in the business, which is now branded Niva Bupa.

==== Since 2010 ====
In 2012, Bupa acquired the largest private healthcare network in Poland, LUX MED, from the private equity fund Mid Europa Partners for €400m.

Other acquisitions in this period included: Dental Corporation, Australia and New Zealand's largest dental provider; Quality HealthCare, a private clinic network in Hong Kong; a 49% stake in Highway to Health, Inc., a US health insurer specialising in providing international health insurance for US residents planning to live or work abroad.

In February 2015, Bupa acquired a controlling share in Chilean private healthcare network Cruz Blanca. In 2016, Bupa became the sole owner of Cruz Blanca (branded as Bupa Chile). Bupa Chile opened a major hospital in Santiago in 2018.

In 2016, Bupa acquired Care Plus, a health insurance business in Brazil.

In the UK, in 2016, Bupa sold its home healthcare medication delivery division to Celesio AG.

In 2017, Bupa completed the purchase of Oasis Dental Care, the UK's leading private dental provider with 380 practices, for £835 million, from Bridgepoint, a Private Equity group. As a result, Bupa became a major dental provider. The business has since grown to around 490 clinics in the UK and the Republic of Ireland. Bupa operates dental practices in the Republic of Ireland under the Smiles Dental brand.

In the UK, in August 2017, it sold 122 care homes, with 9,000 beds, to HC-One for £300 million. 22 further homes were sold to Advinia Healthcare.

In 2018, Sanitas acquired Nectar Seguros, a Spanish private health insurer.

In January 2019, Bupa acquired Acibadem Sigorta in Turkey. Bupa Acıbadem Sigorta is Turkey's second largest health insurer with both corporate and individual customers. Headquartered in Istanbul, it insures 600,000 people. In December 2020, Bupa México announced the acquisition of BBVA México's medical services provider Vitamédica. In January 2021, in the UK, the transfer of CS Healthcare's business and 17,500 members to Bupa completed.

Iñaki Ereño became Group CEO in January 2021. Ereño was previously the CEO of Bupa's Europe and Latin America and CEO of Sanitas. The joint position was subsequently filled by Iñaki Peralta and, since 2026, by Carlos Jaureguizar.

Following the Russian invasion of Ukraine and the resulting war, Bupa announced that it would be ending relations with businesses in Russia and Russian-controlled businesses.

Through its business in Poland, Lux/Med, Bupa has been working with the authorities and other institutions to offer urgent free medical assistance to refugees from Ukraine through its 258 medical centres and 13 hospitals. It has set up teams of paramedics, doctors and medical equipment to solve the problems of the refugees and their families, as well as providing employment for Ukrainian medial staff in its facilities.

== Operations and business structure ==
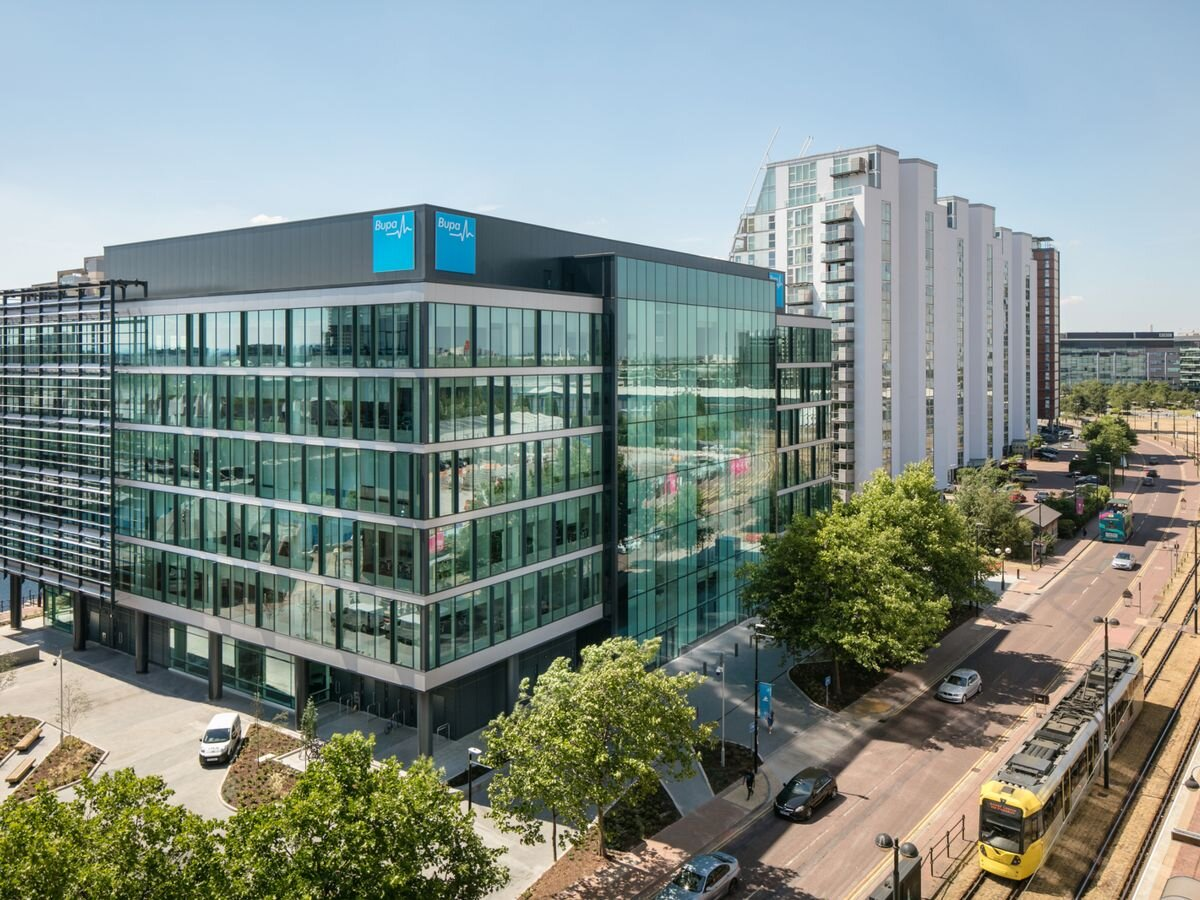
Bupa Building in Salford, Greater Manchester, United Kingdom

This is taken from published corporate information by Bupa and regulatory reports, financial disclosures. Bupa's global operations across its group are structured across three divisions ("Market Units") together with a number of other business and partnerships.

=== Asia Pacific ===
- Bupa Health Insurance, with 3.9 million customers, is a leading health insurance provider in Australia and also offers health insurance for overseas workers and visitors.
- Bupa Health Services is a health provision business, comprising dental, optical, audiology, medical assessment services and health care for the Australian Defence Force.
- Bupa Villages and Aged Care Australia cares for around 5,300 residents across 59 homes and 1 retirement village.
- Bupa Villages and Aged Care New Zealand cares for around 3,300 residents in 49 homes and 37 retirement villages in New Zealand.

The company's main office is in Melbourne. Other major offices are in Adelaide, Brisbane and Sydney.

- Bupa Hong Kong comprises a health insurance business with around 468,000 customers and a health provision business with 89 medical centres providing services to around 890,000 customers.

=== Europe and Latin America ===
- Sanitas Seguros is the second largest health insurance provider in Spain, with 1.9 m customers.
- Sanitas Hospitales and New Services comprise four private hospitals, 29 private medical clinics and one public hospital under a Public-Private partnership model.
- Sanitas Dental provides dental services through 200 centres and third-party networks in Spain.
- Sanitas Mayores cares for around 5,300 people in 43 care homes and six day care centres in Spain.
- LUX MED is a private healthcare business in Poland, with 124,000 customers operating in health funding and provision, serving 7.6m customers through 13 hospitals and 258 private clinics.
- Bupa Chile Its hospital network comprises Clínica Bupa Santiago, Clínica Bupa Reñaca and Clínica Bupa Antofagasta, with Clínica Bupa Santiago being the largest Bupa hospital in the world. Bupa Chile serves more than 3.2 million people and includes IntegraMédica, a nationwide outpatient healthcare network with more than 34 medical centres across Chile, as well as Bupa Seguros, which has close to 900,000 insured members, and Isapre Cruz Blanca.
- Bupa Acıbadem Sigorta is Turkey's second largest health insurer, with products for corporate and individual customers, and has around 986,000 customers.
- Care Plus is a health insurance company in Brazil, with around 143,000 customers, concentrated in São Paulo.
- Bupa Mexico is a health insurer offering private medical insurance to individuals and corporates in Mexico, with around 77,000 customers.
- Bupa Global Latin America provides international health insurance, local health insurance, and travel insurance to around 72,000 customers. Main operations include Guatemala, Panama, Dominican Republic, Colombia, Ecuador, Bolivia and Chile, as well as a health provision business in Peru.

The Europe and Latin America's division's headquarters are in Madrid, and since 2026 is headed by Carlos Jaureguizar.

=== Bupa Global and UK ===
- Bupa UK Insurance is a health insurer in the UK, with 2.3m customers.
- Bupa Dental Care is a leading provider of private dentistry with 480 dental centres across the UK and the Republic of Ireland.
- Bupa Care Services cares for around 6,000 residents in 123 care homes, and 10 Richmond care villages in the UK.
- Bupa Health Services comprises 50 health clinics and the Cromwell Hospital in London.
- Bupa Global serves over 510,000 International Private Medical Insurance customers and administers travel insurance and medical assistance for individuals, small businesses and corporate customers.

Bupa has its global and UK head offices in central London. In the UK, there are also major offices in Staines, Salford Quays, Brighton, Bristol and Leeds.

=== Other businesses ===
Bupa also has associate health insurance businesses in Saudi Arabia (Bupa Arabia) and India (Niva Bupa).

== Foundations ==
Bupa supports a number of grant-giving foundations in different countries which work on health and social issues. During the COVID19 pandemic there was an extra effort to support communities through its charitable foundations in Australia, UK and Spain. A Healthy Communities Fund was established, with a special emphasis on mental health and wellbeing in schools.

=== United Kingdom ===
The Bupa UK Foundation focuses on grant-giving and charity partnerships around mental health. These include Beyond Words for World Mental Health Day supported by Cheltenham Festivals, Mind, National Literacy Trust.

=== Australia ===
The Bupa Health Foundation is one of the leading charitable foundations dedicated to health in Australia. The foundation invests in research that claims to improve health and it collaborates with researchers across academic, industry and healthcare communities. It advocates for researchers, organisations and initiatives that are improving health capacity building by developing skills and networks of health and medical researchers. Over the last 10 years the foundation has invested more than AUS$35 million in partnerships. Focus areas include youth mental health including partnerships with Kids Helpline, Macquarie University Centre for Emotional Health, Edith Cowan University.

=== Spain ===
The Fundacion Sanitas focuses on inclusive sports, the recognition of young doctors in Spain, the health and well-being of caregivers of people with dementia, cooperation in health and research in cardiovascular diseases.

== Controversies ==
=== United Kingdom ===
Bupa has been criticised by some judges, coroners and regulators regarding failures to meet regulatory standards in some of its residential care homes.

Staff and families of residents in some care homes have criticised Bupa for allegedly prioritising profits to the detriment of care.

In 2017, there was a data breach involving health insurance customers in the Bupa Global division.

In 2018, Bupa UK was fined £1,500,000 after a care home resident died after contracting Legionnaires' disease.

Bupa has been fined over £3 million by UK government agencies since 2013.

=== Australia ===
Bupa's operations in Australia have been the subject of regulatory action and criticism in news media, particularly in 2018 and 2019.

Previous issues and allegations made include:

- Neglect of elderly patients or residents. Complaints by the Aged Care Minister Richard Colbeck that Bupa had persistently failed to meet regulatory standards. Bupa's ANZ CEO gave an apology on ABC for "totally unacceptable" failings . There were other incidents including infection related incidents and assault. For example, a carer in New South Wales was found to have assaulted an 82 year old resident; the family of the resident put CCTV there.
- Charging aged care residents in 20 of its homes for "extra" services that were not ultimately delivered to 4,306 residents. Bupa's apology and explanation of the issue are here. In May 2020, the Australian Federal Court approved a AUS$6m settlement between Bupa and the Australian Competition and Consumer Commission (ACCC).

== See also ==
- Private healthcare in the United Kingdom
