= CUNEF University =

Spanish private university

Coordinates: 40.45157°N 3.72015°W

- CUNEF Universidad
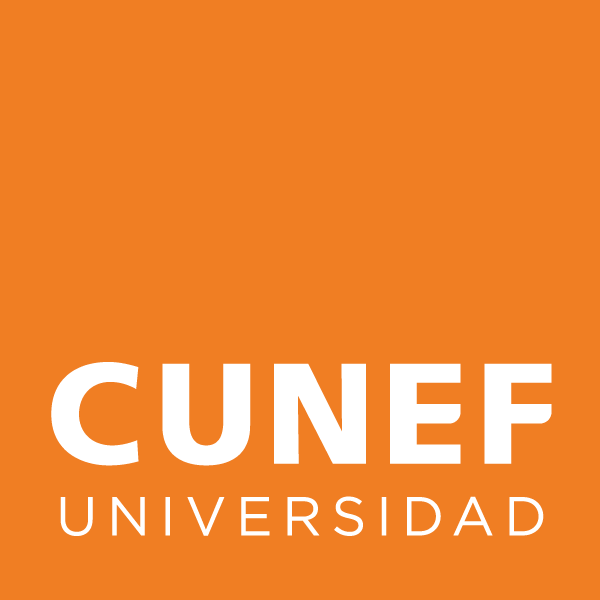
- Motto: Excellence, future, success
- Type: Private
- Established: 1973
- Founder: Spanish Banking Association
- President: Álvaro Cuervo García
- Rector: Ana Isabel Fernández Álvarez
- Location: Madrid, Spain
- Colours: Orange
- Website: https://www.cunef.edu/en

CUNEF University is a Spanish private university, located in Madrid and specialising in business and economics, mathematics and computer science and digital business, law and institutions.

== History ==
In 1973 the Higher Banking Council, now called the Spanish Banking Association, founded the university as the University College of Financial Studies. At that time, the institution operated as an affiliated center of the Complutense University of Madrid.

In 2019 it was recognised as an independent university. Its academic trajectory as an independent private university began in the 2021–2022 academic year.

In 2023, it was ranked number 1 in the Forbes ranking of private universities in Spain and is known to be a common university choice among members of prominent Spanish business and social families due to the high quality of the education and the international exposure.
