= Iñaki Ereño =

Spanish business executive and CEO of Bupa

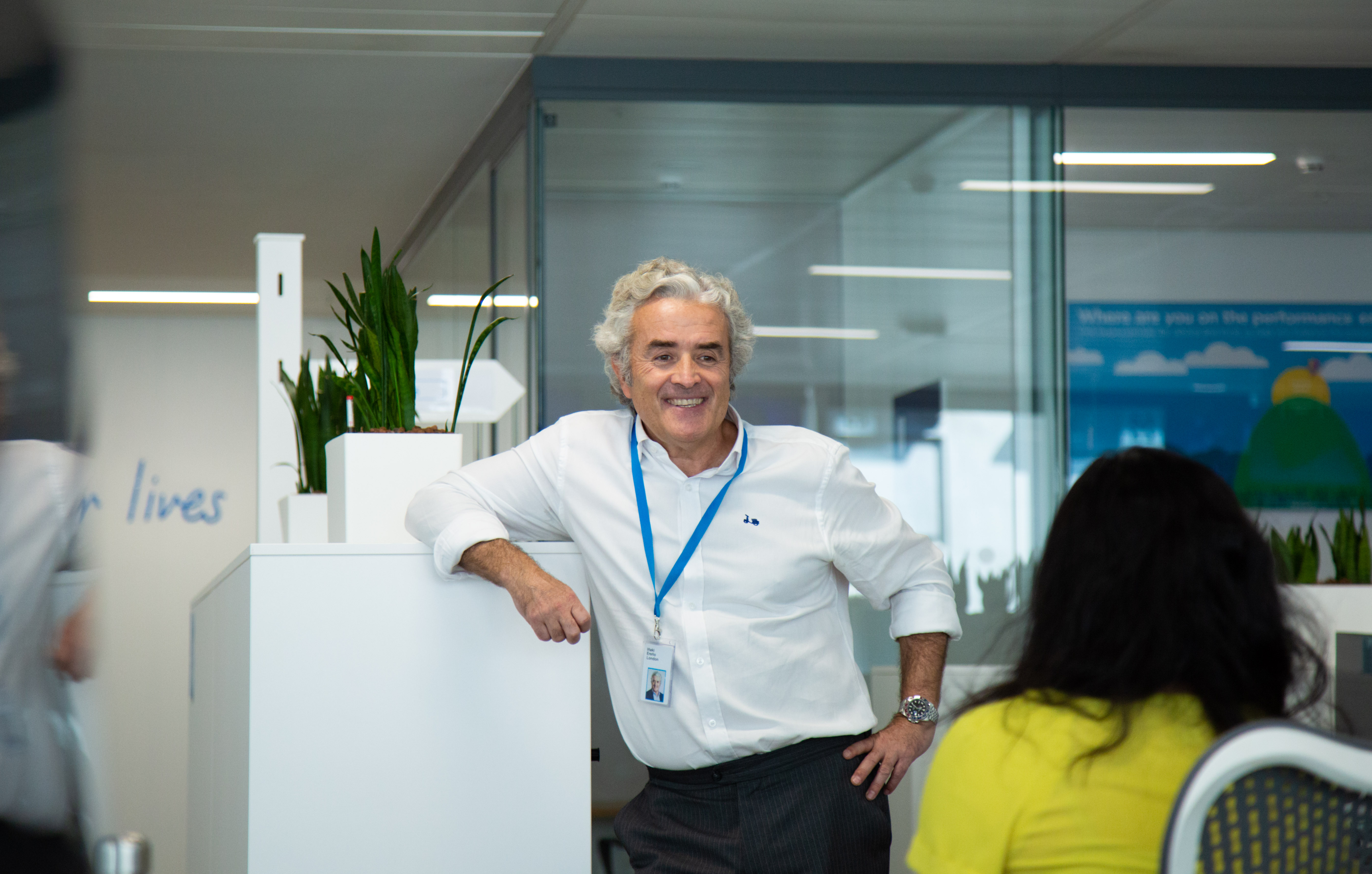
- Born: February 16, 1964 (age 62); Melilla
- Education: ICADE, MBA IESE, Wharton School
- Occupations: Group CEO, Bupa

Iñaki Ereño (Melilla, 16 February 1964) is the CEO of Bupa, the international healthcare company headquartered in the United Kingdom. He was previously CEO of Sanitas, the Spanish health insurance company, and CEO of Bupa's Europe and Latin America business. He was responsible for the digital transformation of Sanitas and the international expansion of Bupa's businesses in Europe and Latin America. Throughout his career he has been one of the pioneering entrepreneurs on the Internet.

== Career ==
A graduate in law from ICADE (Universidad Pontificia Comillas), he completed his training with a Master's in Business Administration (MBA) from IESE and an Advanced Management Programme from the Wharton School (University of Pennsylvania).

He worked in the French multinational Continente (part of the Carrefour Group) before its merger with Pryca as marketing director. In 1999 he founded the online start-up Netels.com. In 2003, he was the Marketing Services Director of Páginas Amarillas when it was a subsidiary of Telefónica de España (part of the Telefónica Group).

== Sanitas & Bupa ==
In 2005, he joined Sanitas as General Manager of Customers and Marketing. In 2008 he was appointed CEO of Sanitas, which has been part of Bupa since 1989. His stated purpose as CEO was: “the digitalisation of the company and its services as the key to making patients' lives easier, as well as providing the medicine of the future”. The strategy to lead the digitalisation of Sanitas relied on innovation as the main tool for improving services.

In 2012, he was appointed CEO for Spain and Latin America with the commitment to expand the integrated health model developed in Spain: insurance, hospitals, dental clinics and nursing homes for the elderly. In 2016, his remit was expanded to CEO of Bupa Europe and Latin America.

In September 2020, he was appointed to the position of Group CEO at Bupa. Iñaki Ereño replaced Evelyn Bourke, who retired as Bupa's Group CEO at the end of 2020.
