= OCBC =

OCBC may refer to:

- OCBC Bank (Oversea-Chinese Banking Corporation), a bank based in Singapore
  - OCBC Centre, the headquarters of OCBC Bank in Singapore
- Oakland Cannabis Buyers' Cooperative, a medical marijuana cooperative based in Oakland, California
- Oriel College Boat Club, a rowing club of Oriel College, Oxford
