= ZA Bank Limited =

Bank in Hong Kong

- Logo of ZA Bank
- Type: Private
- Industry: Virtual banking, Financial services
- Founded: August 2018; 8 years ago in Hong Kong
- Founder: ZhongAn
- Headquarters: UNIT 1301, LEVEL 13, IT STREET, CYBERPORT 3, 100 CYBERPORT ROAD, HONG KONG
- Area served: Hong Kong
- Key people: Calvin Ng
- Products: Deposits, loans, investment, insurance distribution
- Owner: Z Fin Limited (46.04%); ZhongAn(43.65%); Warrior (7.68%); AIA Group (2.63%)
- Number of employees: ~200 (2023)
- Website: bank.za.group/hk/

ZA Bank Limited (Chinese: 眾安銀行有限公司), ZA Bank in short, is a licensed virtual bank headquartered in Hong Kong. It is one of the first eight virtual banks authorized by the Hong Kong Monetary Authority (HKMA) under the 2019 virtual banking licensing scheme.

ZA Bank is a subsidiary of ZA Global, whose major shareholders include ZhongAn, Z Fin Limited, Warrior Investment, and AIA Group. The bank launched its pilot trial in December 2019 and officially began public operations in March 2020. It provides retail banking services through a mobile-only platform, including savings and time deposit accounts, personal loans, and insurance distribution.

Its head office is located at Cyberport 3, Pok Fu Lam, Hong Kong.

== History ==
In August 2018, ZhongAn Online P&C Insurance, Z Fin Limited, and initially China CITIC Bank International formed a joint venture named ZhongAn Virtual Finance Limited to apply for a virtual bank licence from the Hong Kong Monetary Authority (HKMA). CITIC later withdrew before the licence was granted and its executive Raymond Or resigned from the board in February 2019.

On 27 March 2019, the HKMA issued virtual banking licences to the first batch of applicants, including ZhongAn Virtual Finance Limited, which was later renamed ZA Bank. ZA Bank launched its pilot trial on 18 December 2019 under the HKMA Fintech Supervisory Sandbox.

The bank became the first virtual bank in Hong Kong to begin full operations on 24 March 2020, offering mobile-only banking services including savings accounts, time deposits, local transfers(include FPS), facial recognition login, and multi-currency support.

In February 2020, ZA Bank partnered with Fiserv to implement the VisionPLUS payment platform for card issuance and transaction processing.

Subsequently, ZA Bank introduced several new features:

- In October 2020, it launched a custom-number Visa debit card (ZA Card). The physical card was issued in November.
- By March 2021, it expanded into SME banking with commercial accounts and unsecured business loans.
- In 2022, ZA Bank acquired a Type 1 licence from the Securities and Futures Commission (SFC), partnered with Generali for insurance distribution, launched investment fund services, and integrated Wise for cross-border remittances.

By the end of June 2023, ZA Bank had about 700,000 retail customers, a deposit balance of HK$10.7 billion and a gross loan balance of HK$4.9 billion.

In March 2025, the bank appointed Chung Hon Ng (Ng Chung-hon) as CEO, effective 27 March 2025.
