= Faster Payment System (Hong Kong) =

Real-time gross settlement payment system in Hong Kong

Faster Payment System Chinese: 快速支付系統
- Logo of Faster Payment System (FPS)
- Other names: 轉數快
- Developer: Hong Kong Monetary Authority
- Initial release: 17 September 2018; 7 years ago
- Website: Official website

Faster Payment System (FPS; Chinese: 快速支付系統, more commonly known as 轉數快) is a real-time gross settlement payment system in Hong Kong that connects traditional banks and electronic payment and digital wallet operators. Users are able to perform instant money transfer or make payment to merchants by using the recipient's phone number, e-mail or QR code that contains the user's numeric identifier. Using the "traditional way" of full name and account number to make interbank transfer is also allowed.

The system was implemented by the Hong Kong Monetary Authority and operated by Hong Kong Interbank Clearing Limited (HKICL). It was launched for pre-registration on 17 September 2018. Transfers and payments is available since 30 September 2018.

== Features ==
=== Cheap transfers ===
Traditional interbank transfers required payment of fees between 50 HKD and 200 HKD, or a waiting time of up to two days before the payment clears. FPS provides an instant, round-the-clock and cheap way of transferring funds. For personal banks accounts, interbank fund transfer through FPS is normally free of service charges.

=== Payment by QR code ===
Participants in the FPS share a common standard for the QR code which allows paying to merchants using a variety of payment methods like bank cards, stored value facilities or direct debit from bank accounts.

HKMA has released a tool for merchants to convert QR codes from different payment providers into a single standard QR code.

=== Currencies ===
FPS supports payments in Hong Kong dollars (HKD) and Renminbi (CNY).

== Notable participants ==
=== Traditional banks ===
- Bank of China (Hong Kong)
- Bank of Communications
- Bank of East Asia
- China Citic Bank International
- China Construction Bank (Asia)
- Chiyu Banking Corporation
- Chong Hing Bank
- Citibank (Hong Kong)
- CMB Wing Lung Bank
- Dah Sing Bank
- DBS Bank (Hong Kong)
- Hang Seng Bank
- HSBC (The Hongkong and Shanghai Banking Corporation)
- Industrial and Commercial Bank of China (Asia)
- Nanyang Commercial Bank
- OCBC Wing Hang Bank
- United Overseas Bank
- Shanghai Commercial Bank
- Standard Chartered (Hong Kong)
- ZA Bank Limited

=== E-wallet operators ===
- AlipayHK
- Tap & Go (HKT Payment Limited)
- Octopus Wallet (Octopus Cards Limited)
- WeChat Pay HK
- PayMe
- BoC Pay (Bank of China (Hong Kong))
- 5D Pay (Yintran Group Holdings Limited)

== Incidents ==
=== October 2018 ===
After 3 weeks of launching FPS in Hong Kong, there were several cases of fraud reported to Hong Kong Police that involved a combined loss of HKD 180,000 to customers. After the incidents were found, HKMA suspended the top up function of all e-wallets operators until the security issues were fixed. A few days later, it was revealed that more than 10 suspected cases were reported and the loss was surged to HKD 400,000.

== See also ==
- Clearing House Automated Transfer System, the original (but still operational) RTGS system in Hong Kong
