= Reclining Figure 1938 =

Sculpture series by Henry Moore

Large Reclining Figure
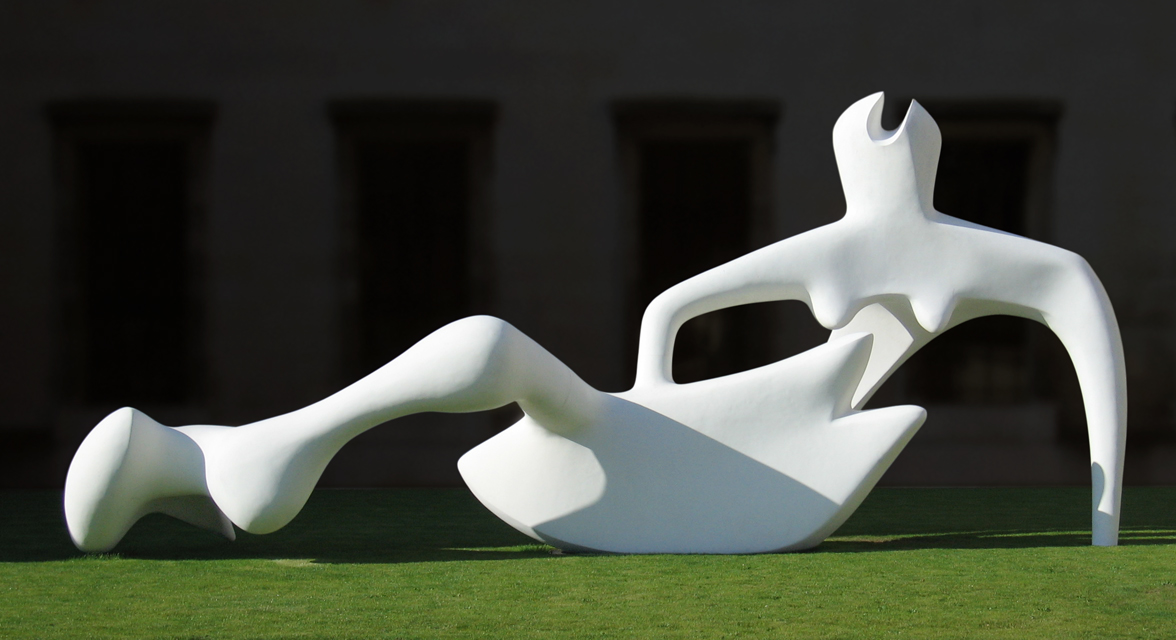
- Large Reclining Figure outside the Fitzwilliam Museum, Cambridge, 2004
- Artist: Henry Moore
- Year: 1983
- Catalogue: LH 192b
- Medium: Fiberglass
- Dimensions: 340 cm × 900 cm × 310 cm (130 in × 350 in × 120 in)

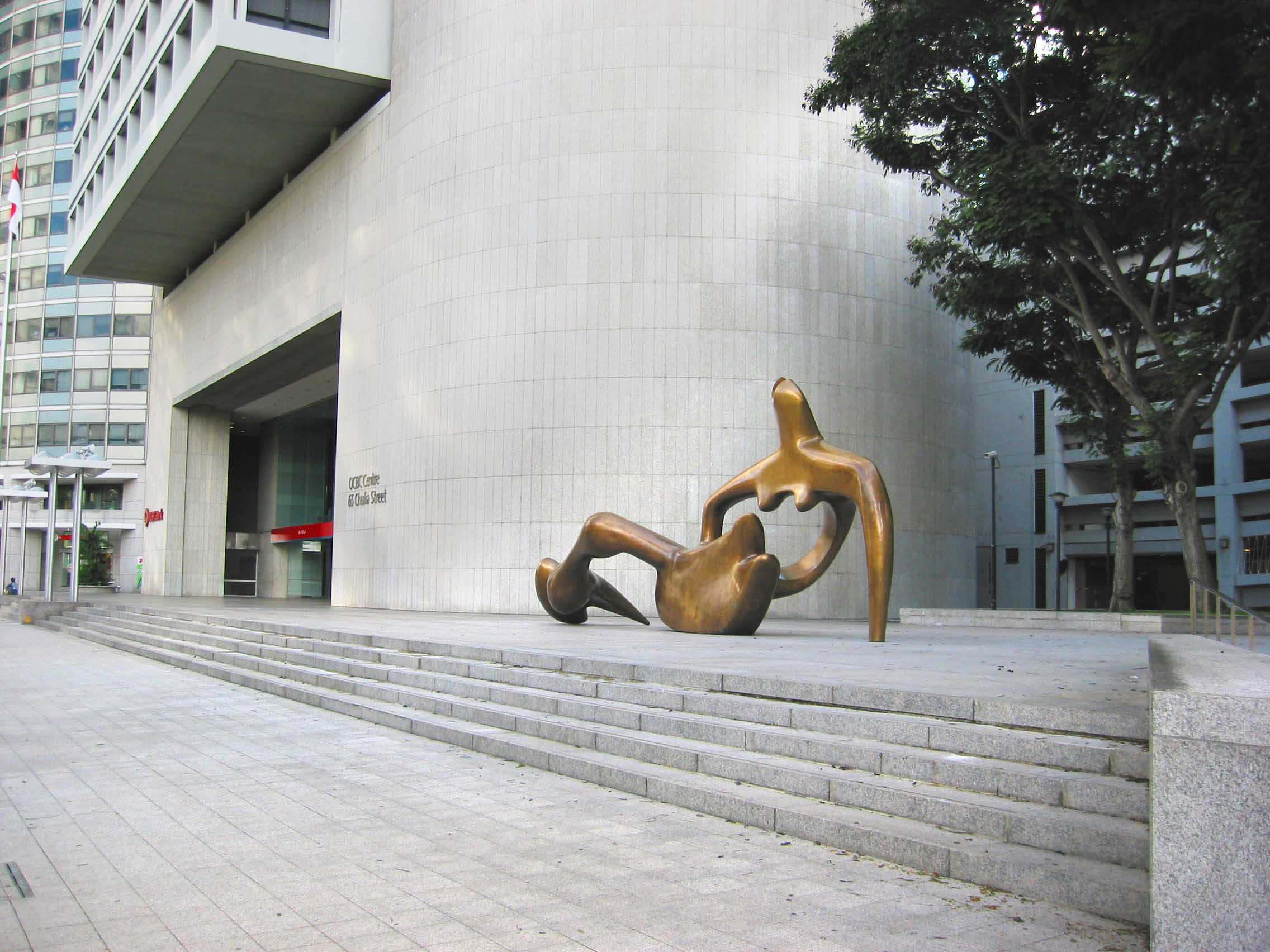
Bronze at the OCBC Centre, Singapore

Reclining Figure 1938 (LH 192) is a small sculpture by Henry Moore of an sinuous abstracted human figure. An enlarged version was made in 1984 for the Oversea-Chinese Banking Corporation, Singapore. The resulting Large Reclining Figure (LH 192b) is some 9 metres (30 ft) long, making it the largest sculpture made by Moore.

== Description ==
The sculpture is recognisable as a human form. The head has a notch, like a claw; the narrow torso has two dangling breasts; the left arm rests on the ground, while the right arm and ribbon-like backbone are linked to a pelvis resting on the ground, from which to one long bone-like limb extends to one side.

== Casts ==
A 5.75 by 13 inches (14.6 cm × 33.0 cm) lead maquette was made by Moore in 1938, and sold by him to the Museum of Modern Art in New York in 1939. An edition of nine bronzes was cast in 1946; one example is held by the Peggy Guggenheim Collection in Venice, and another in the Leeds Art Gallery since 1991.

The 1938 version was only 33 centimetres (13 in) long. It was enlarged in 1984 for a commission from the Oversea-Chinese Banking Corporation in Singapore to create a 9 metres (30 ft) long bronze, one of Moore's largest ever sculpture. The original Large Reclining Figure (LH 192b) is outside the OCBC Centre in Singapore, with an artist's copy in bronze at the Henry Moore Foundation in Perry Green, Hertfordshire. There is also a 9 metres (30 ft) long white fibreglass version of the enlarged sculpture, which was displayed at Kew Gardens in 2004.

== See also ==
- List of sculptures by Henry Moore
