= Fitzwilliam Museum =

University Museum in Cambridge, England

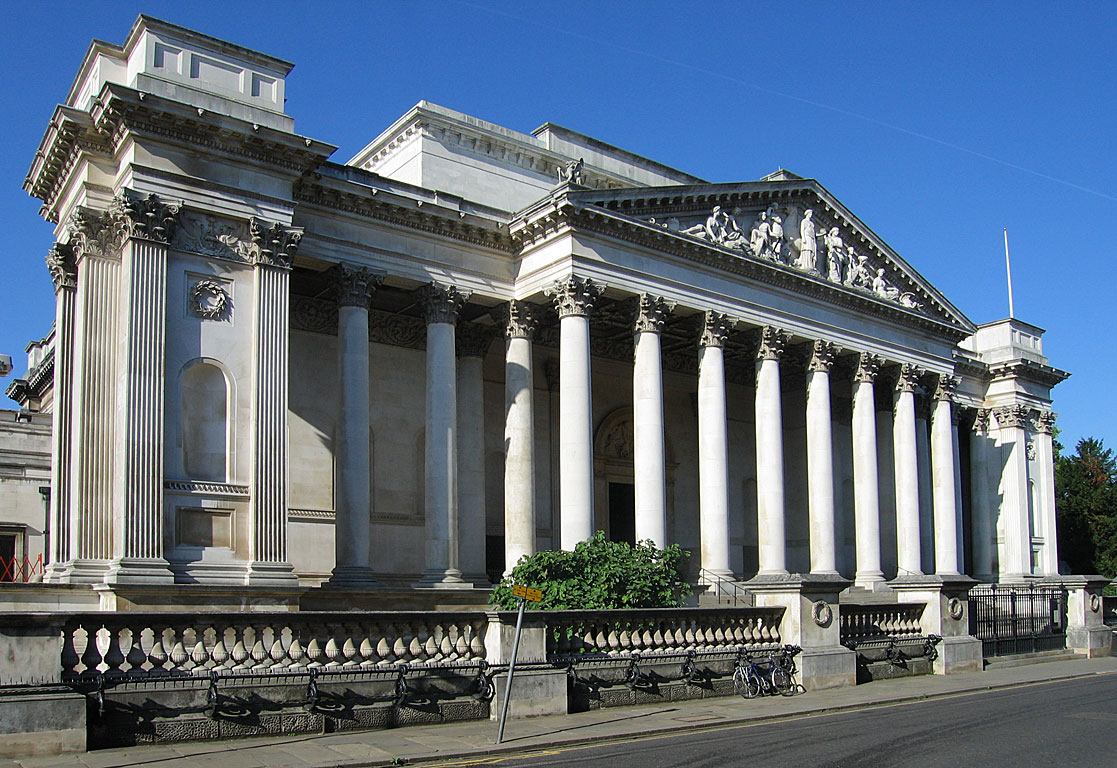
- The main entrance to the Fitzwilliam Museum

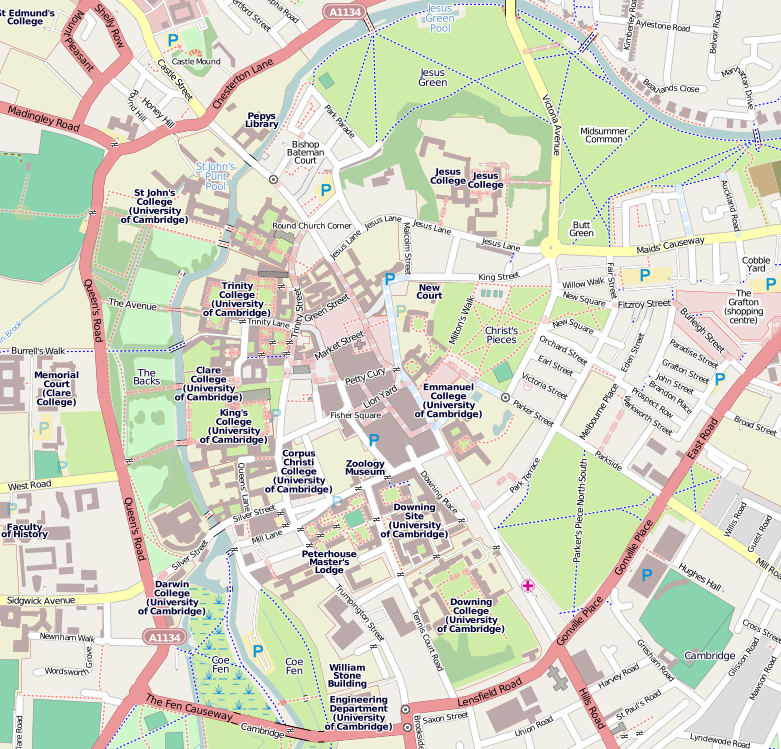
- Location in Cambridge
- Interactive fullscreen map
- Established: 1816, by Richard FitzWilliam, 7th Viscount FitzWilliam
- Location: Cambridge, England
- Coordinates: 52.200278°N 0.119444°E
- Type: University Museum of fine art and antiquities
- Collection size: approx. 600,000
- Visitors: 493,612 (2025)
- Director: Luke Syson
- Website: www.fitzmuseum.cam.ac.uk

University of Cambridge Museums
- Fitzwilliam Museum; Kettle's Yard; Museum of Archaeology and Anthropology; Museum of Classical Archaeology; Whipple Museum of the History of Science; Sedgwick Museum of Earth Sciences; The Polar Museum; Museum of Zoology

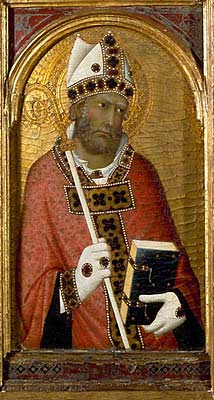
Saint Geminianus, from a pentaptych by Simone Martini (c. 1284–1344)

The Fitzwilliam Museum is the art and antiquities museum of the University of Cambridge. It is located on Trumpington Street opposite Fitzwilliam Street in central Cambridge. It was founded in 1816 under the will of Richard FitzWilliam, 7th Viscount FitzWilliam (1745–1816), and comprises one of the best collections of antiquities and modern art in western Europe. With over half a million objects and artworks in its collections, the displays in the museum explore world history and art from antiquity to the present. The treasures of the museum include artworks by Monet, Picasso, Rubens, Vincent van Gogh, Renoir, Rembrandt, Cézanne, Van Dyck, and Canaletto, as well as a winged bas-relief from Nimrud. Admission to the public is always free.

The museum is a partner in the University of Cambridge Museums consortium, one of 16 Major Partner Museum services funded by Arts Council England to lead the development of the museums sector.

== Foundation and buildings ==
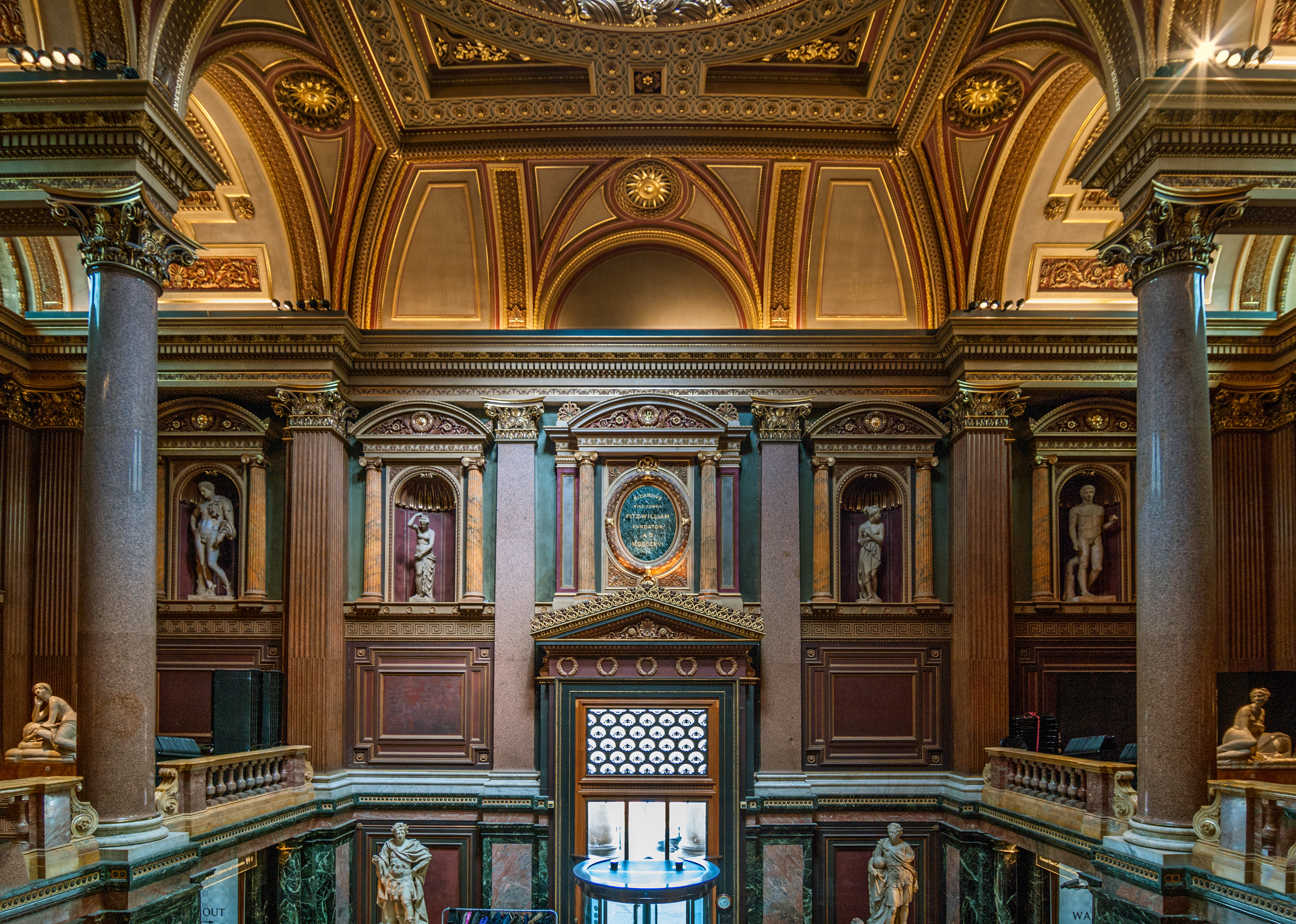
View of one of the museum's entrance halls

The museum was founded in 1816 with the legacy of the library and art collection of Richard FitzWilliam, 7th Viscount FitzWilliam. The bequest included £100,000 "to cause to be erected a good substantial museum repository". The Fitzwilliam now contains over 500,000 items and is one of the best museums in the United Kingdom. The collection was initially placed in the Perse School building in Free School Lane. It was moved in 1842 to the Old Schools in central Cambridge, which housed the Cambridge University Library.

The "Founder's Building" was built during the period 1837–1843 to the designs of George Basevi, completed by C. R. Cockerell. The decorative carving, pediment and four lions were by William Grinsell Nicholl. The foundation stone of the new building was laid by Gilbert Ainslie in 1837. The museum opened in 1848. The Palladian Entrance Hall, by Edward Middleton Barry, was completed in 1875. A further large bequest was made to the university in 1912 by Charles Brinsley Marlay, including £80,000 and 84 paintings from his private collection. A two-storey extension to the south-east, paid for partly by the Courtauld family, was added in 1931, greatly expanding the space of the museum and allowing research teams to work on site.

The museum buildings and, separately, the boundary along the street frontage, are Grade I listed.

== Collection ==
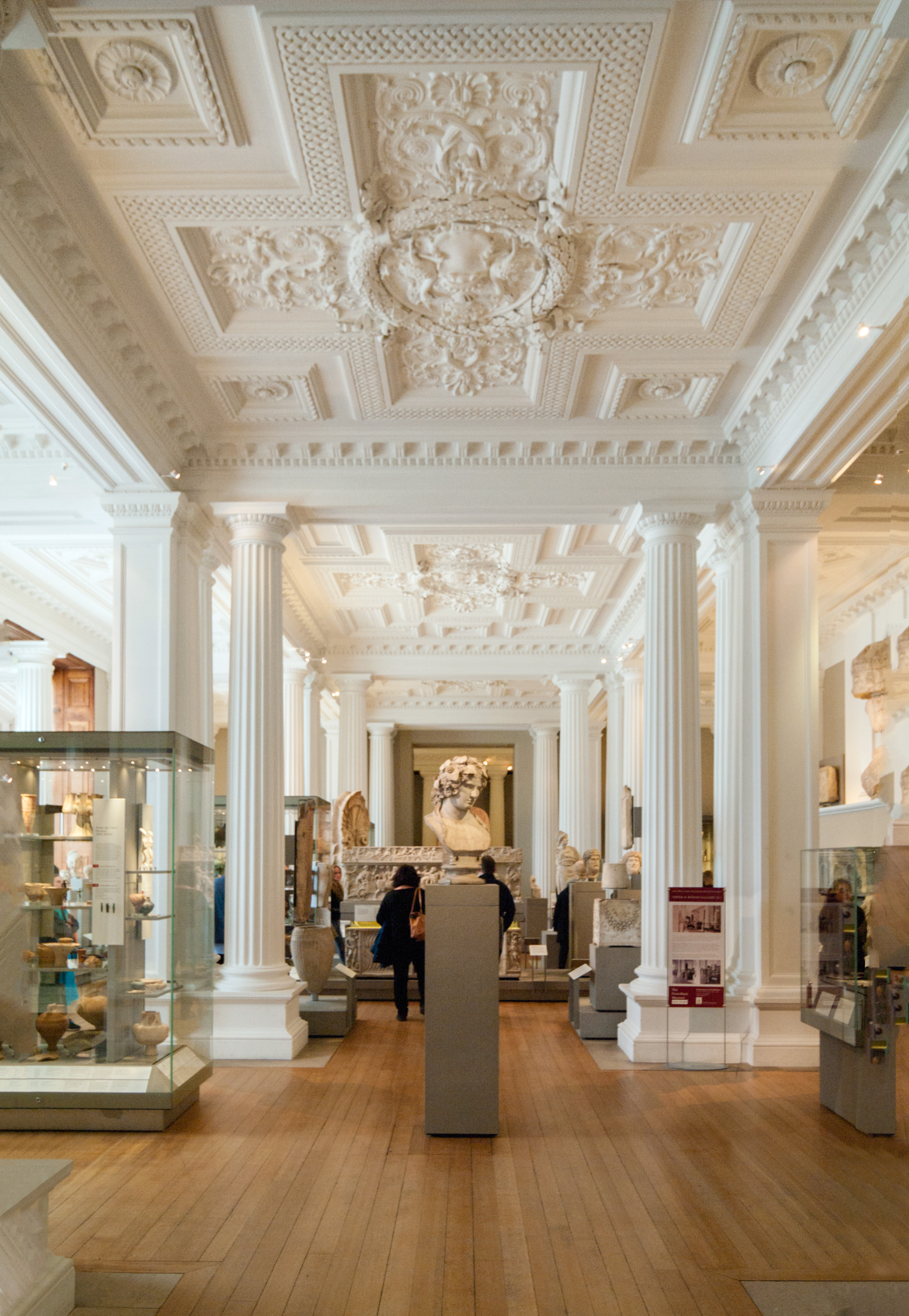
Marble bust of Antinous, lover of the Emperor Hadrian

The museum has five departments: Antiquities; Applied Arts; Coins and Medals; Rare Manuscripts and Printed Books; and Paintings, Drawings and Prints. Together these cover antiquities from ancient Egypt, Nubia, Greece and Rome, Romano-Egyptian art, Western Asiatic displays, and a new gallery of Cypriot art; applied arts, including English and European pottery and glass, furniture, clocks, fans, armour, Chinese, Japanese and Korean art, rugs and samplers; coins and medals; illuminated, literary and music manuscripts and rare printed books; paintings, including masterpieces by Simone Martini, Domenico Veneziano, Titian, Veronese, Rubens, Van Dyck, van Goyen, Frans Hals, Canaletto, Hogarth, Gainsborough, Constable, Monet, Degas, Renoir, Cézanne and Picasso and a fine collection of 20th-century art; miniatures, drawings, watercolours and prints. Among the notable works in the antiquities collection is a bas-relief from Persepolis, and a colossal caryatid from Eleusis known as the Saint Demetra.

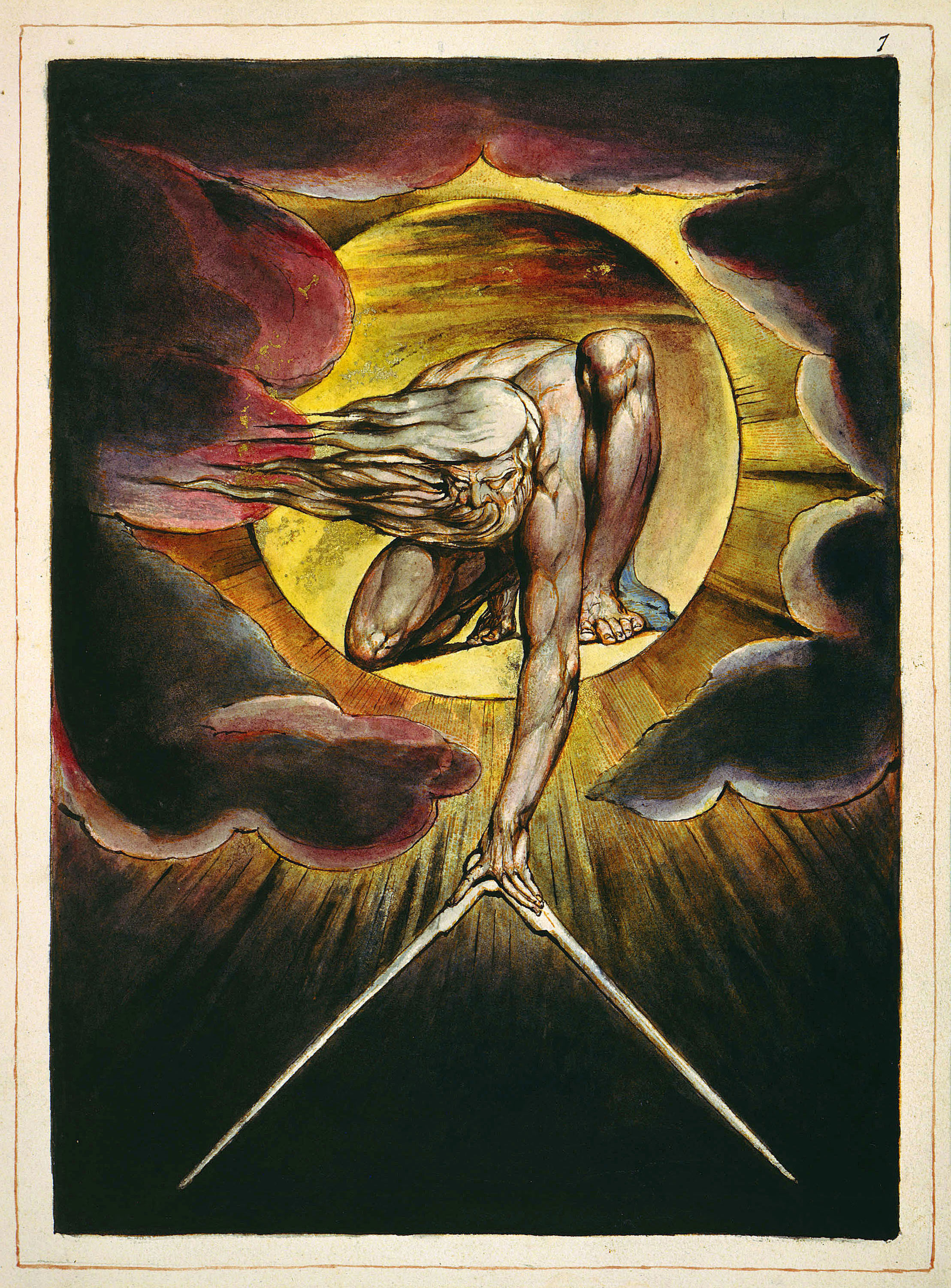
Copy K of William Blake's The Ancient of Days, 1794

=== Music manuscripts ===
There is also the largest collection of 16th-century Elizabethan virginal manuscript music written by some of the most notable composers of the time, such as William Byrd, Doctor John Bull, Orlando Gibbons and Thomas Tallis.

=== Egyptian collection ===
The Egyptian Galleries at the Fitzwilliam Museum reopened in 2006 after a two-year, £1.5 million programme of refurbishment, conservation and research. The redevelopment also allowed for the public display of more antiquities which had previously been confined to the Fitzwilliam's underground storage facility. The Egyptian Galleries are among the museum's most popular exhibits. They feature an immersive public display which allows families and young visitors to understand the context and landscape of ancient Egyptian through participatory exhibitions. Today, the Fitzwilliam's Egyptian Galleries contain some of the best displays on Egyptian antiquities outside the British Museum.

=== Paintings ===
The museum has a wide collection of paintings and sketches, including works by Monet, Picasso, Rubens, Vincent van Gogh, Cézanne, Degas, Rembrandt, Van Dyck, Canaletto, Constable, Murillo (The Vision of Fray Lauterio), and Renoir. It also has extensive works by J. M. W. Turner, which has its origins in a set of 25 watercolour drawings donated to the university by John Ruskin in 1861. Sir Sydney Cockerell, who was serving as director of the museum at the time, acquired a further eight Turner watercolours and some of his writings.

The museum's collection of Pre-Raphaelite paintings includes a version of Ford Madox Brown's 1855 The Last of England, voted eighth-greatest painting in Britain in 2005's Radio 4 poll, the Greatest Painting in Britain Vote.

Many items in the museum are on loan from colleges of the University of Cambridge, for example an important group of impressionist paintings owned by King's College, which includes Cézanne's The Abduction and a study for Sunday Afternoon on the Island of La Grande Jatte by Seurat. Many of the Fitzwilliam's paintings were donated by alumni and donors of the University of Cambridge, for instance, the economist Maynard Keynes donated his personal collection, including Cezanne's Still Life With Apples which he bought in 1918.

Anglo-American
- Benjamin West – 2 paintings;
- John Constable – 12 paintings;
- John Hoppner – 1 painting;
- J. M. W. Turner – 1 painting

Dutch School
- Aelbert Cuyp – 1 painting;
- Gerrit Dou – 3 paintings;
- Frans Hals – 1 painting;
- Meyndert Hobbema – 2 paintings;
- Adriaen van Ostade – 2 paintings;
- Rembrandt – 1 painting;
- Jacob van Ruisdael – 5 paintings;
- Salomon van Ruysdael – 1 painting;
- Jan Steen – 3 paintings;
- Adriaen van de Velde – 1 painting;
- Willem van de Velde the Younger – 1 painting;
- Jan Weenix – 1 painting;
- Philip Wouwerman – 2 paintings;
- Vincent van Gogh – 1 painting

English School

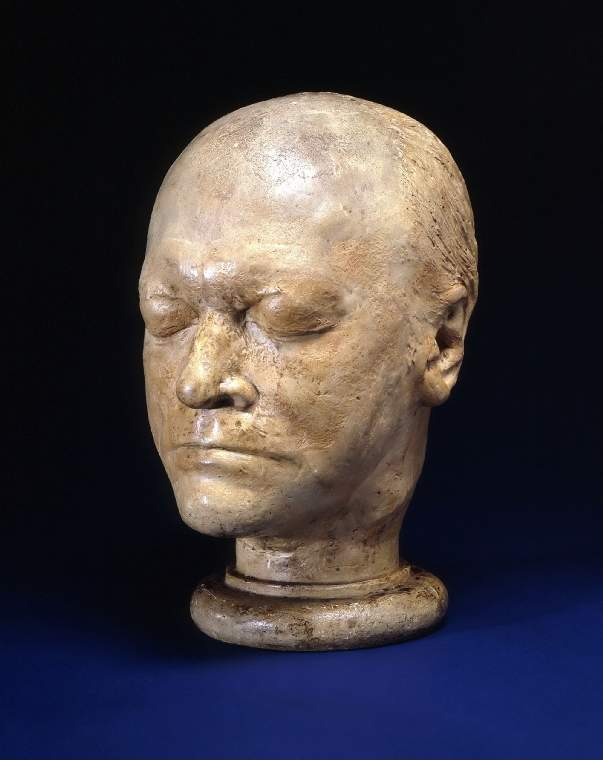
Life mask of William Blake; plaster cast by James De Ville (September 1823)

- William Beechey – 1 painting;
- William Blake – 4 paintings, and hundreds of watercolours, drawings, prints and manuscripts;
- John Constable – 12 paintings;
- Thomas Gainsborough – 8 paintings;
- Joseph Highmore - 6 paintings;
- William Hogarth – 9 paintings;
- John Hoppner – 1 painting;
- Sir Godfrey Kneller – 15 paintings;
- Edwin Henry Landseer – 1 painting;
- Thomas Lawrence – 1 painting;
- Peter Lely – 1 painting;
- Joshua Reynolds – 4 paintings;
- Joseph Stannard – 1 painting;
- George Stubbs – 3 paintings;
- J. M. W. Turner – 1 painting (Welsh mountain landscape, 1799–1800);

Flemish School
- Jan Brueghel the Elder – 5 paintings;
- Pieter Bruegel the Elder – 1 painting;
- Frans Francken the Younger – 1 painting;
- Jan Mabuse – 1 painting;
- Peter Paul Rubens – 14 paintings;
- David Teniers the Younger – 2 paintings;
- Anthony van Dyck – 5 paintings;

French School
- Eugène Delacroix – 4 paintings;
- François Boucher – 1 painting;
- Jean-Baptiste-Camille Corot – 3 paintings;
- Edgar Degas – 7 paintings;
- Gaspard Dughet – 3 paintings;
- Paul Gauguin – 1 painting;
- Claude Lorrain – 1 painting;
- Jean-Baptiste Greuze – 1 painting;
- Jean-Étienne Liotard – 2 paintings;
- Claude Monet – 4 paintings;
- Camille Pissarro – 6 paintings;
- Nicolas Poussin – 1 painting;
- Pierre-Auguste Renoir – 11 paintings;
- Théodore Rousseau – 3 paintings;
- Georges-Pierre Seurat – 1 painting;
- Jean-François de Troy – 1 painting;

German School
- Hans Holbein the Younger – 2 paintings;

Italian School
- Alessandro Allori – 1 painting;
- Jacopo Bassano – 2 paintings;
- Canaletto – 6 paintings;
- Annibale and Ludovico Carracci – 4 paintings;
- Bernardo Daddi – 1 painting;
- Carlo Dolci – 3 painting;
- Domenichino – 1 painting;
- Duccio di Buoninsegna – 1 painting;
- Gentile da Fabriano – 1 painting;
- Domenico Fetti – 5 paintings;
- Raffaellino del Garbo – 1 painting;
- Lattanzio Gambara – 8 paintings;
- Luca Giordano – 12 paintings;
- Guercino – 1 painting;
- Pietro Longhi – 2 paintings;
- Lorenzo Lotto – 1 painting;
- Andrea Mantegna – 9 canvases known as Triumphs of Caesar
- Parmigianino – 2 paintings and 30 drawings
- Palma il Vecchio – 2 paintings;
- Pietro Perugino – 1 painting;
- Giambattista Pittoni – 1 painting;
- Francesco Pesellino – 1 painting;
- Raphael – 8 Paintings;
- Raffaellino del Garbo – 1 painting;
- Guido Reni – 1 painting;
- Sebastiano Ricci – 9 paintings;
- Giulio Romano – 6 paintings;
- Andrea Sacchi – 130 drawings;
- Andrea del Sarto – 2 paintings;
- Zanobi Strozzi – 1 painting;
- Tintoretto – 5 paintings;
- Titian – 4 paintings;
- Perin del Vaga – 2 paintings;
- Giorgio Vasari – 1 painting;
- Paolo Veronese – 3 paintings;
- Antonio Verrio – 1 painting;
- Federico Zuccari – 1 painting;
- Francesco Zuccarelli – 27 paintings;

=== Michelangelo bronzes ===
In 2015, the museum displayed the Rothschild Bronzes, two bronze statues that it believed to be the work of Italian Renaissance artist Michelangelo. If true, they would be the only known surviving bronze sculptures by the artist. The pair of statues depict naked, apparently drunk, men riding panthers. Art historian Paul Joannides connected the statues to a drawing in the Musée Fabre by an apprentice of Michelangelo depicting the same subject in the same pose.

=== Incidents ===
On 25 January 2006, a visitor tripped and shattered three massive Qing Dynasty vases which had been on public display since 1948. In April 2006, the man was arrested but charges of causing criminal damage were dropped. Scholars and restoration experts from the Fitzwilliam Museum were able to reconstruct the damaged porcelain vases and largely restore them to their former splendour. The vases have been put back on display and are now protected by security glass.

On 13 April 2012, 18 pieces of Chinese jade were stolen by a gang nicknamed the Rathkeale Rovers. The burglars were eventually caught and sentenced to a combined 18 years in jail, but several of the most valuable pieces were not recovered and are speculated to have been sold to China. Estimates of the lost artefacts' value range up to £57 million, making the heist one of the most significant by value in UK history.

== Friends of the Fitzwilliam Museum ==
External videos
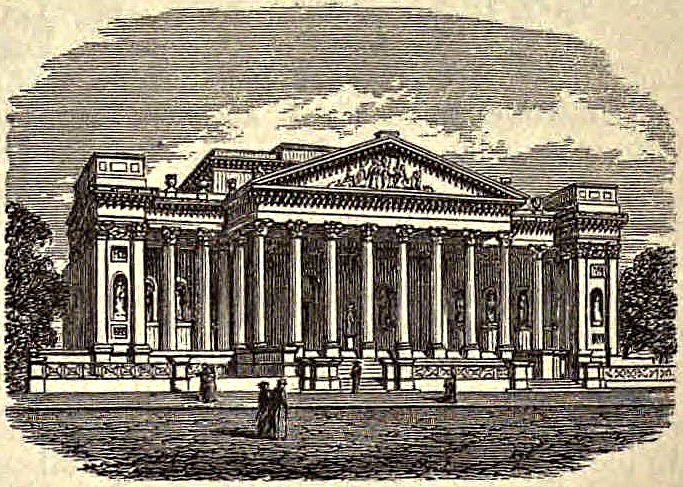
- Celebrating 200 years of the Fitzwilliam Museum, 1:18, Fitzwilliam Museum

The Society of Friends of the Fitzwilliam Museum was founded in 1909 and was the first supporter group established at a British art institution. The Friends of the Fitzwilliam Museum have raised funds to acquire major artworks and provide for the expansion and refurbishment of the museum site. The current priorities of the Friends of the Fitzwilliam Museum include acquisition of major contemporary works and development of a significant endowment to secure the museum for posterity.

Princess Alexandra of Kent is president of the Fitzwilliam Museum Development Trust.

== Directors ==
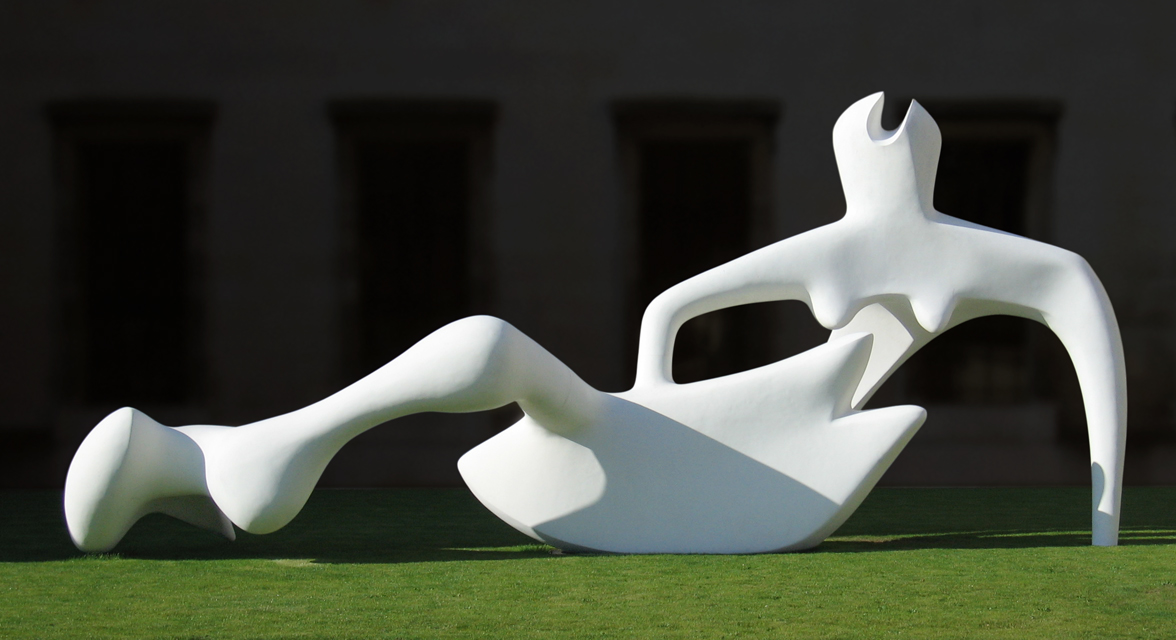
Henry Moore, Large Reclining Figure, 1984 (based on a smaller model of 1938), outside the museum in 2004

The following have been directors of the museum:

- Sidney Colvin 1876–1884
- Sir Charles Walston 1883–1889
- John Henry Middleton 1889–1892
- Montague Rhodes James 1893–1908
- Sir Sydney Cockerell 1908–1937
- Louis Clarke 1937–1946
- Carl Winter 1946–1966
- Sir David Piper 1966–1973
- Professor Michael Jaffé 1973–1990
- Simon Swynfen Jervis 1990–1995
- Duncan Robinson 1995–2007
- Timothy Potts 2007–2012
- Tim Knox 2012––2018
- Luke Syson 2019–

== Curators and keepers ==
- Winifred Lamb, Honorary Keeper of Greek and Roman Antiquities, 1920–1958

== See also ==
- Ashmolean Museum — the Fitzwilliam's sister museum at the University of Oxford
- British Museum — major restoration, research and exhibition partner
- Hamilton Kerr Institute — department of the Fitzwilliam Museum, dedicated to the study and conservation of paintings
- Primavera Gallery – commercial gallery on King's Parade that has been the subject of an exhibition at the Fitzwilliam Museum
