= The Vision of Fray Lauterio =

Painting by Bartolomé Esteban Murillo

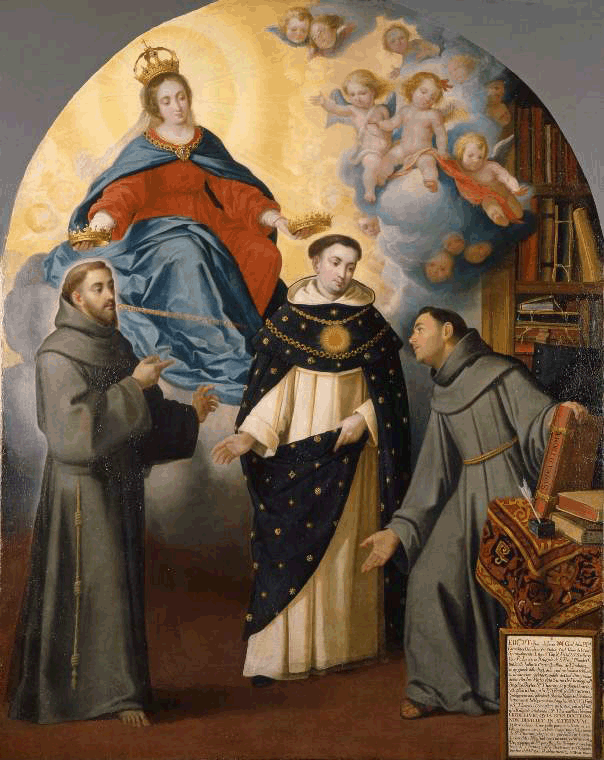
- Artist: Bartolomé Esteban Murillo
- Year: c. 1640
- Medium: Oil on canvas
- Location: Fitzwilliam Museum, Cambridge

The Vision of Fray Lauterio is an oil on canvas painting by Bartolomé Esteban Murillo, from c. 1640. It is held in the Fitzwilliam Museum, in Cambridge, to which it was offered by Joseph Prior in 1879.

== Description ==
It shows the eponymous Franciscan friar to the right unable to understand a passage in Thomas Aquinas's Summa Theologica and praying to Francis of Assisi, shown on the left granting his prayer and pointing to Thomas himself in the centre.

== Provenance ==
The painting had originally been owned by the Dominican monastery of La Regina Angelorum in Seville (hence its depiction of the Virgin Mary surrounded by angels) and was owned by Francesco Pereyra after that monastery was dissolved.
