= PayMe =

Mobile payment service based in Hong Kong

- Developer: HSBC
- Release: 8 February 2017; 9 years ago
- Operating system: iOS, Android
- Available in: English, Simplified Chinese, Traditional Chinese
- Type: Mobile payment
- Website: payme.hsbc.com.hk

PayMe (officially known as PayMe from HSBC) is a mobile payment service from HSBC, currently available only for Hong Kong users with local phone numbers and banks. Users can pay businesses, transfer money to one another using a mobile app, linked to their credit card or (any local) bank account.

As of April 2026, the service had around 3.3 million active users.

== History ==
On its launch on 8 February 2017, heavy traffic meant that some users were unable to register, leading to media dubbing the service "Play Me". Topping up was only possible from a Visa or Mastercard credit card, with a limit of HK$10,000 per month.

In April 2018, the app won the FinTech Grand Award in the official Hong Kong ICT Awards.

From June 2018, users were able to link to a local bank account, with monthly top-up limits raised to HK$30,000, or HK$50,000 with a verified residential address. At the same time, PayMe launched an online shopping payment service, in collaboration with HKTVmall.

In March 2019, PayMe started supporting person-to- merchant (P2M) payments with PayMe for Business, which was built natively on Microsoft Azure.

In July 2019, PayMe introduced the support of FPS (Faster Payment System) for transfers and top-up, along with a complete redesign of the app. At the same time, PayMe lowered the top-up limit for credit cards to HK$2,000 per month.

In May 2022, PayMe was selected to be one of the eligible electronic platforms for the consumption voucher scheme.

In April 2026, HSBC has been awarded Hong Kong’s first stablecoin issuer licences by Hong Kong Monetary Authority. HSBC will launch its Hong Kong dollar stablecoin in the second half of 2026, integrating it into PayMe and its mobile banking platforms.

== Features ==
PayMe was introduced as a standalone mobile app, offering P2P social payment. Users register via a Facebook account or Hong Kong mobile phone number and authorise access to a credit card or local bank account (not necessarily an HSBC account), from which the balance can be topped up, and a bank account to receive money.

There are no transaction fees.

When the PayMe account balance is too low to make a given transaction, the app automatically withdraws the necessary funds from the registered bank account or card.

The social networking interaction component allows users to send and request money and split bills with others, similarly to Venmo in the United States. When the user makes a transaction, the details are posted on the social timeline, and available for other users to see, subject to privacy settings. On 12 March 2025, it was announced that this feature would be removed on 13 April 2025, following reports that the Office of the Privacy Commissioner for Personal Data was investigating PayMe, primarily concerning the risk of personal data (such as transaction records) being exposed due to default settings for early users.

The app encourages users to add friends, by searching for available contacts in the app. If a user makes a transaction to a non-PayMe user, a sharable payment link is created that can be distributed through social media such as WhatsApp. When the user opens the link, they can choose to collect the money by inputting their bank account, or receive it by creating a new PayMe account.

== In popular culture ==
PayMe is referenced in the 2021 movie All U Need Is Love, where - at around the 30 minutes mark - the character played by Julian Cheung asks another hotel guest to pay him "Lai see" (red packet money) to join the triad, only to be asked in return if he takes PayMe instead.

== See also ==
- Paym
- AlipayHK
- WeChat Pay
- Octopus card
- TNG Wallet
- Tap & Go
