= Rothschild Bronzes =

Two bronze statues attributed to Michelangelo

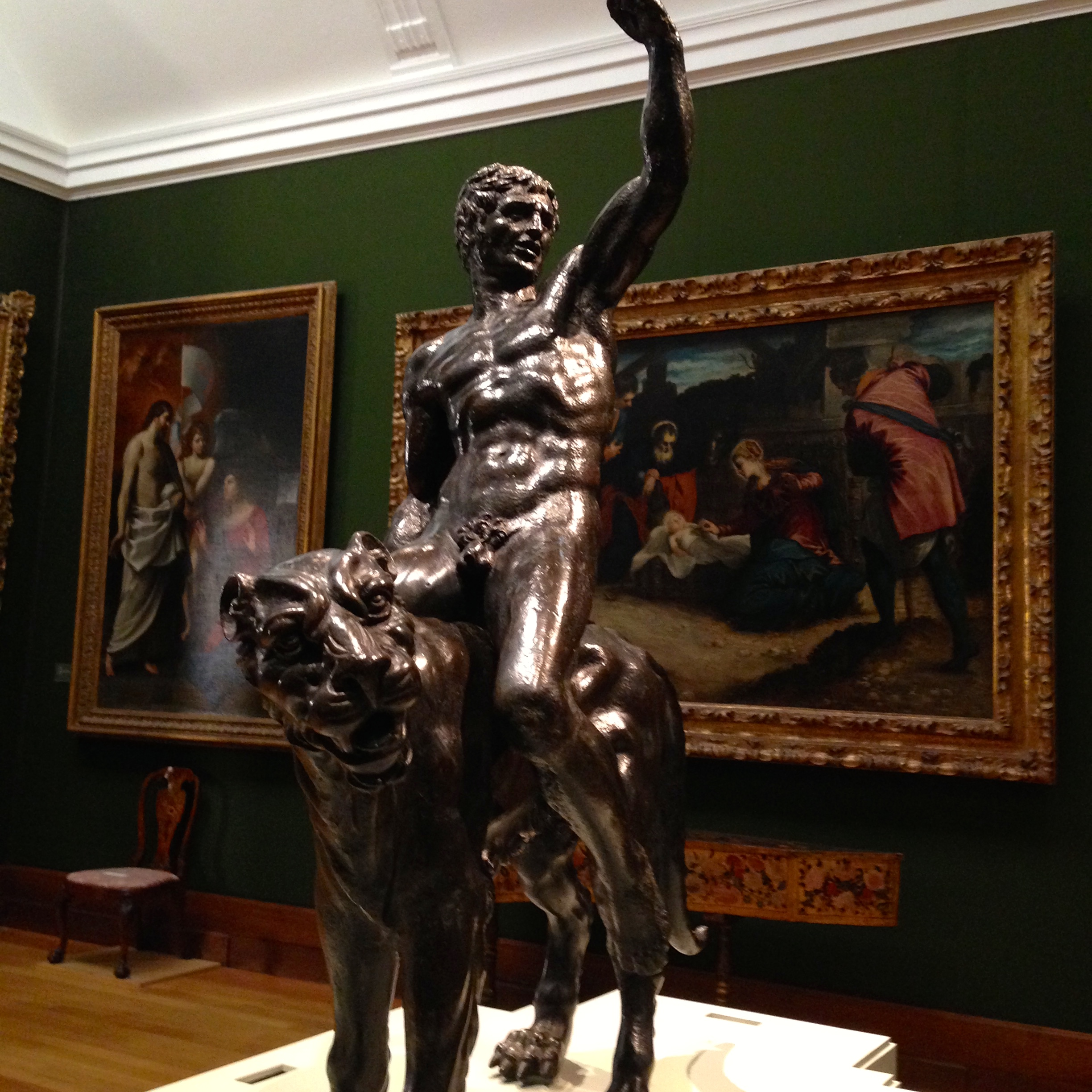
- One of the bronzes displayed in 2015
- Artist: Attributed to Michelangelo
- Location: Fitzwilliam Museum; University of Cambridge

The Rothschild Bronzes, also known as the Michelangelo Bronzes, are a pair of 16th century statuettes, each depicting a nude male figure riding a mythological animal, usually identified as a panther. Mirroring each other in pose, the nude men are distinguished by age, one young, the other bearded. The younger man is 76.6 cm, the other almost 90 cm high. The sculptures are unsigned and the figures and panthers have been separately cast. The bronzes were displayed to the public at the Fitzwilliam Museum, University of Cambridge, from February to August 2015 with an attribution to Michelangelo. If the attribution is correct, Michelangelo would have made the bronzes around 1506 to 1508, before the painting of the Sistine Chapel ceiling but after the marble statue of David. The sculptures would be the only autograph bronze works by Michelangelo to have survived.

== Provenance and Attribution ==
The bronzes were exhibited at the Paris Exposition Universellein 1878 as the work of Michelangelo, although this attribution was disputed at the time. The works had been acquired the previous year in Venice by Baron Adolphe de Rothschild and Julie de Rothschild.

When the Rothschilds' heir Maurice de Rothschild died in 1957, they were purchased by a French private collector. Over the years, the sculptures had been attributed to other artists, including Tiziano Aspetti, Jacopo Sansovino and Benvenuto Cellini, or their respective circles.

In 2002, they were again sold, at Sotheby's London to a British collector for £1.8m, as a mid sixteenth-century Florentine artist in the circle of Benvenuto Cellini. In 2003 they were lent by the new owner to an exhibition, Willem van Tetrode (c. 1525-1580), at the Frick Collection, New York, with an attribution to this Dutch sculptor. In 2012, they were exhibited at the Bronze exhibition held at the Royal Academy of Arts as mid sixteenth-century Roman.

Paul Joannides, an eminent scholar of Michelangelo's drawings, saw the bronzes in 2002 and was struck by their Michelangelesque qualities. Seeing the bronzes again in 2012, Joannides linked the sculptures to a drawing of a youth astride a leonine animal in the Musée Fabre in Montpellier, a plausible copy of a lost work by Michelangelo. This resulted in the display of the bronzes in the Fitzwilliam in 2015, and an accompanying publication by Victoria Avery and Paul Joannides which argued that the bronzes were indeed by Michelangelo. The attribution rested on three planks: firstly, on the bronzes' link to the Montpellier drawing, secondly on their similarity in appearance to other works by Michelangelo, and, thirdly, on a neutron scan, conducted in Switzerland, which dated the bronzes to the first decade of the 16th century. The possibility that they might be by Michelangelo excited experts, particularly given that no autograph bronzes by Michelangelo are known to have survived. The display of the bronzes in the Fitzwilliam Museum coincided with a symposium on the bronzes held at the University of Cambridge in July 2015. A dissenting voice was provided by Frank Zöllner in Die Welt, a circumspect one by David Ekserdjian.

== The Fitzwilliam's Verification ==
In November 2018, the Fitzwilliam Museum announced the completion of its reputed verification of Michelangelo's authorship of the bronzes. This elicited an excited response from the media, focusing on the anatomical similarities between the bronzes and Michelangelo's works. The announcement coincided with the publication of a comprehensive volume on Michelangelo's work as a sculptor of bronze and the Rothschild bronzes in particular, edited by Victoria Avery and collecting many of the papers presented at the 2015 symposium. Avery's publication took the attribution to Michelangelo as now proven, eliciting a critical response from Nicholas Penny in The Burlington Magazine who judged the riders and panthers to be a pastiche of independently made sculptures, none of which derive from models by Michelangelo. A more neutral position on the question of attribution was taken by Daniel Godfrey in The Art Newspaper.

== Further Attributions ==
In 2019, John Vedder Edwards pointed out that the Rothschild bronzes are composed in an "open profile," with their arms fully extended. This, Edwards argues, is in direct contravention of Michelangelo's principle of organizing his sculptural figures in a classic "closed profile" with the arms and legs drawn tightly in toward the body. Edwards argues that Michelangelo took to heart the instruction of early Renaissance sculptor Donatello that "a sculpture should be able to be rolled down a hill and have nothing break off." The presence of an "open profile," Edwards asserts, is definitive of a work being of an artist other than Michelangelo. Edwards does suggest that it is not impossible that Michelangelo may have aided Sangallo with the modelling of the torsos of the original wax or clay figures, however there is no evidence to suggest that this must be so. It should be borne in mind, however, that the "closed profile" was the result of Michelangelo's conceiving each of his marble sculptures from single blocks whose excavation, rough hewing and transport he mostly oversaw. In a sonnet for Vittoria Colonna written around 1538-41/44, Michelangelo wrote, "The greatest artist does not have any concept which a single piece of marble does not itself contain within its excess." The tensile strength of bronze sculpture, deriving from a cast of a model, allowed compositions impossible or difficult in marble, such as the raised arms of the panther riders, and witnessed in the almost certainly raised arm of Michelangelo's Pope Julius II in bronze, made in 1508 but destroyed only a few years later. In 2020, Michael Riddick argued that the Rothschild bronzes are more likely to be the work of Francesco da Sangallo, the protégé of Michelangelo and son of Giuliano da Sangallo who mentored Michelangelo in architecture.

== See also ==
- List of works by Michelangelo
