= ZhongAn =

Chinese insurance company

ZhongAn Online P & C Insurance Co. Ltd.
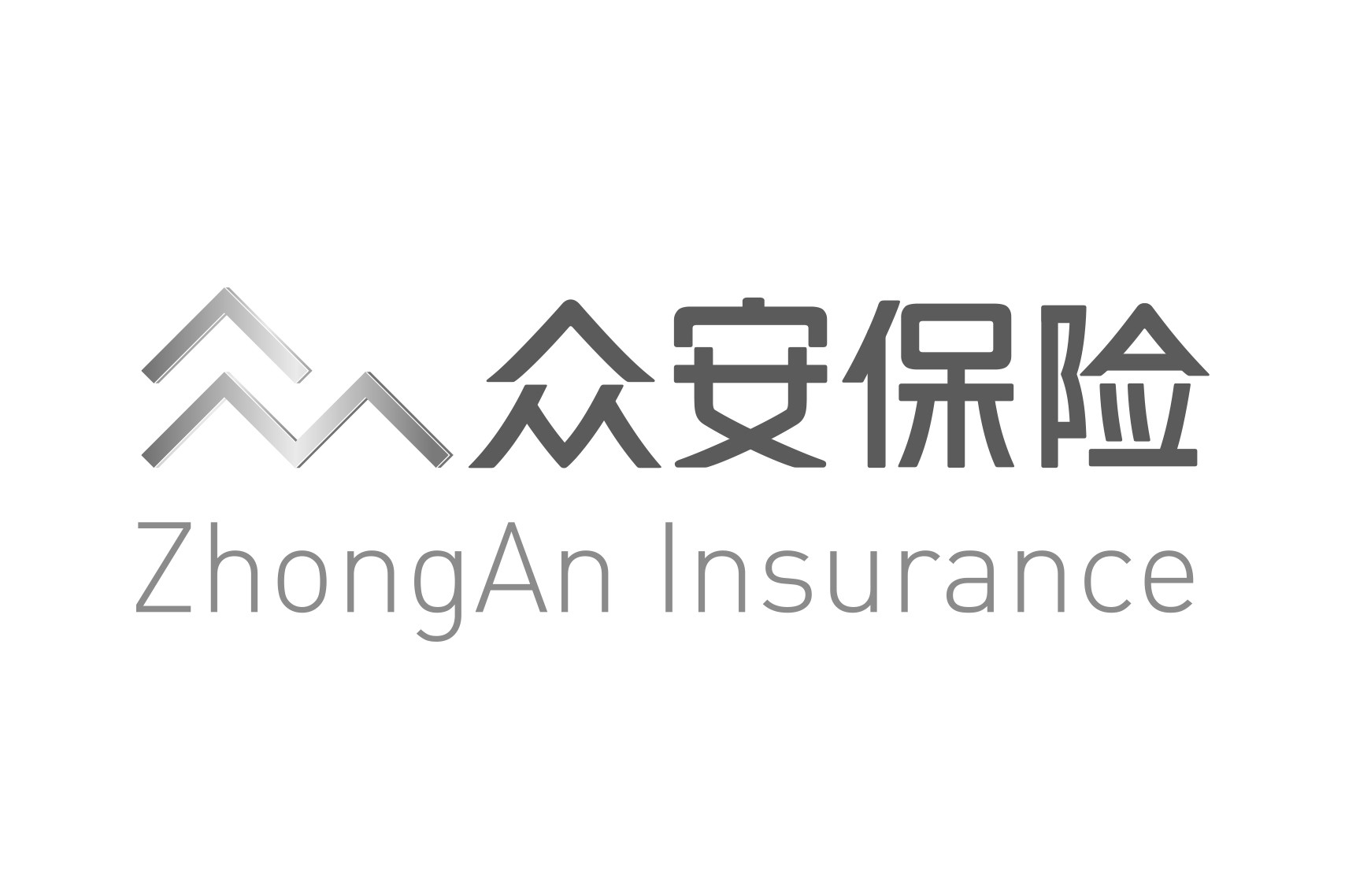
- Traded as: SEHK: 6060
- ISIN: CNE100002QY7
- Industry: Insurance
- Founded: 2013
- Headquarters: Shanghai, China
- Area served: China, Asia Region
- Key people: Yaping Ou
- Services: Online insurance
- Revenue: ▲CN¥33,485 million (2025)
- Total assets: ▲CN¥46,710 million (2025)
- Total equity: ▲CN¥25,449 million (2025)
- Subsidiaries: ZhongAn Information and Technology Services Co., Ltd. ZhongAn Broker
- Website: https://www.zhongan.com/

ZhongAn Online P & C Insurance Co. Ltd. is an online-only insurance company in China. Founded in 2013, the company's headquarters are based in Shanghai, China. ZhongAn's founder is Yaping Ou who currently serves as a non-executive director. The company's CEO is Xing Jiang. The company offers online insurance products through its health, digital lifestyle, consumer finance and auto ecosystems.

== Markets ==
The insurance technology company is listed on the Hong Kong Stock Exchange under the stock code "6060.HK". ZhongAn began floating on the stock exchange in September 2017 and raised US$1.5 billion on its opening day, at a valuation of US$11 billion. This made it the largest initial public offering in Hong Kong in 2017 and also the first insurance technology offering that Hong Kong had. ZhongAn's share prices increased by more than 9% on the opening day of their public trading to HK$65.20. According to the latest data from the National Financial Regulatory Administration, China's insurtech market exceeded 180 billion yuan in 2024, representing a year-on-year increase of 37% and remaining a high-growth market. In 2024, ZhongAn held a market share of over 20% in China's internet property and casualty insurance market, ranking the first.

== Products and services ==
Since ZhongAn's inception, it has up to 500 million users and has issued 9.133 billion insurance policies as of June 30, 2024. Insurance products cover across four ecosystems: health ecosystem, digital lifestyle ecosystem, auto ecosystem and consumer finance ecosystem. A significant proportion of its customer base (60%), are aged 20 to 35 and most consumers from this age group bought their first insurance policy through the company. ZhongAn offers a wide range of personalised products and services to its Chinese consumers.

== Business ==
ZhongAn received approval from the China Insurance Regulatory Commission (CIRC) to add auto insurance and insurance information services to its business scope in 2015, and piloted model clauses in six experimental zones to diversify its premium structure. It also completed a pre-IPO financing round of RMB 5.775 billion, increasing its capital reserves.

In 2016, ZhongAn Technology was established to support technological upgrades in the insurance industry and promote the adoption of blockchain, artificial intelligence, and other emerging technologies.

ZhongAn International was established at the end of 2017 as a global business development platform to explore international collaboration and investment opportunities in overseas fintech and insurtech markets.

In 2018, ZhongAn Technology announced a partnership agreement with Chinese insurance company, AXA Tianping.

ZhongAn obtained a Hong Kong virtual banking license and an internet hospital license in 2019. The upgraded “Wujieshan 2.0” platform went live at the end of the year.

ZA Bank, Hong Kong’s first virtual bank, officially launched in 2020. ZhongAn reached 520 million total users and reported its first net profit since its IPO, indicating a shift from scale-focused growth to a more sustainable model supported by underwriting and technology services.

ZhongAn recorded its first underwriting profit since its founding in 2021. ZhongAn International also launched ZA One, a one-stop financial services platform.

In 2022, ZA Bank entered the investment and wealth management sector and became the first virtual bank in Hong Kong to receive a Type 1 regulated activity (securities trading) license from the Securities and Futures Commission. It launched fund sales services in August 2022 to diversify its revenue sources.

ZhongAn released “AIGC/ChatGPT Insurance Industry Application Whitepaper,” the first domestic whitepaper on generative AI applications in insurance. At the 2023 World Artificial Intelligence Conference, ZhongAn unveiled an AIGC application map for the insurance industry, along with its AIGC central platform “Zhong You Ling Xi”.

Overseas and technology-related businesses contributed to ZhongAn’s financial performance, with these segments accounting for 18% of total revenue in 2024, up from 9% in 2021.

On July 4, 2025, ZhongAn completed the placement of 215 million new H shares, with the proceeds earmarked for overseas expansion and technology research and development to further optimize its capital structure.

== Founders and key individuals ==
The company was originally co-founded by Jack Ma from Alibaba, Pony Ma from Tencent Holdings and Mingzhe Ma from Ping An Insurance Group , together with Yaping Ou, who served as executive chairman of the company until 2022 and has transitioned to a non-executive role since then. In 2023, Hai Yin succeeded Ou as non-executive chairman, bringing over two decades of insurance and fintech expertise. The current CEO, Xing Jiang (appointed in 2019), previously served as CTO and has driven technological innovations of the company such as the proprietary cloud-based insurance core system "Wujieshan", which now processes 19.7 billion policies annually.
