= Generali =

Generali may refer to:

== People ==
Generali is an Italian surname. Notable people with the surname include:

- Pietro Generali (basketball), Italian basketball player
- Pietro Generali, Italian composer

== Other uses ==
- Assicurazioni Generali and Generali Italia, Italian insurance companies
- Generali Arena and Generali Arena (Vienna), football stadiums sponsored by Assicurazioni Generali
