= OCBC Bank (Hong Kong) =

Hong Kong-based bank

OCBC Bank (Hong Kong) Limited OCBC Bank (Macau) Limited
- Company type: Subsidiary
- Founded: Canton, Republic of China (1937)
- Headquarters: Hong Kong, Macau, Mainland China
- Key people: Andrew Khoo (Chairman); Wang Ke (CE)
- Products: Banks, credit cards
- Operating income: ▲HK$7.4 billion (2022)
- Net income: ▲HK$2.5 billion (2022)
- Total assets: ▲HK$339 billion (2022)
- Number of employees: 2,000 (2013)
- Parent: OCBC Bank
- Website: ocbc.com.hk

OCBC Bank
- Traditional Chinese: 華僑銀行（香港）
- Simplified Chinese: 华侨银行（香港）
Transcriptions

OCBC Bank (Hong Kong) Limited, formerly Wing Hang Bank Limited and OCBC Wing Hang Bank Limited, is a licensed bank with its head office in Hong Kong. Since 15 October 2014, Wing Hang Bank has been a wholly owned subsidiary of the Oversea-Chinese Banking Corporation (OCBC) headquartered in Singapore. The acquisition of Wing Hang has given OCBC a network of about seventy branches spanning Hong Kong, Macau and mainland China to add to OCBC's existing operations in Hong Kong and China.

== History ==
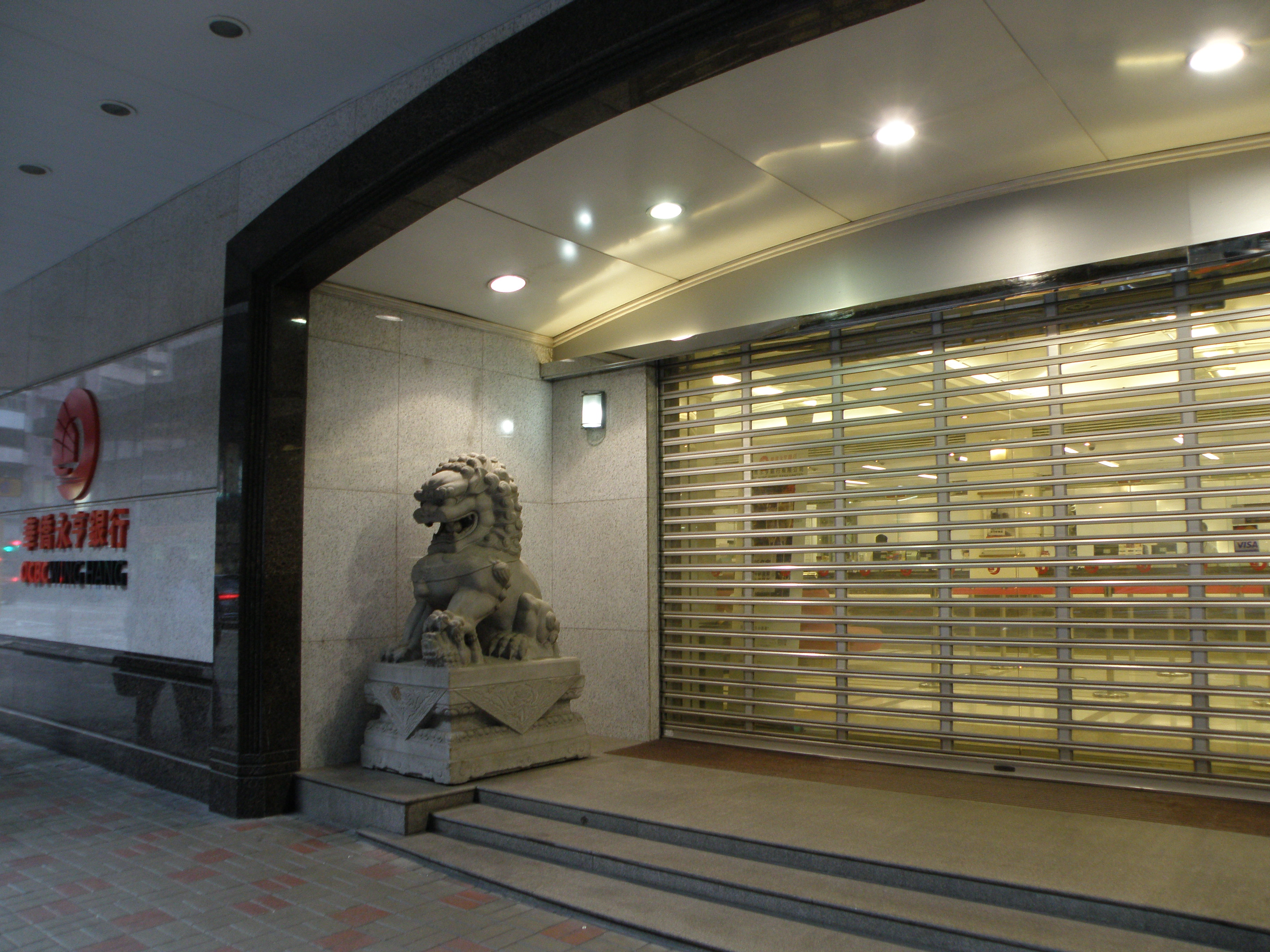
OCBC Wing Hang Bank Queen's Road Central Branch in Hong Kong.

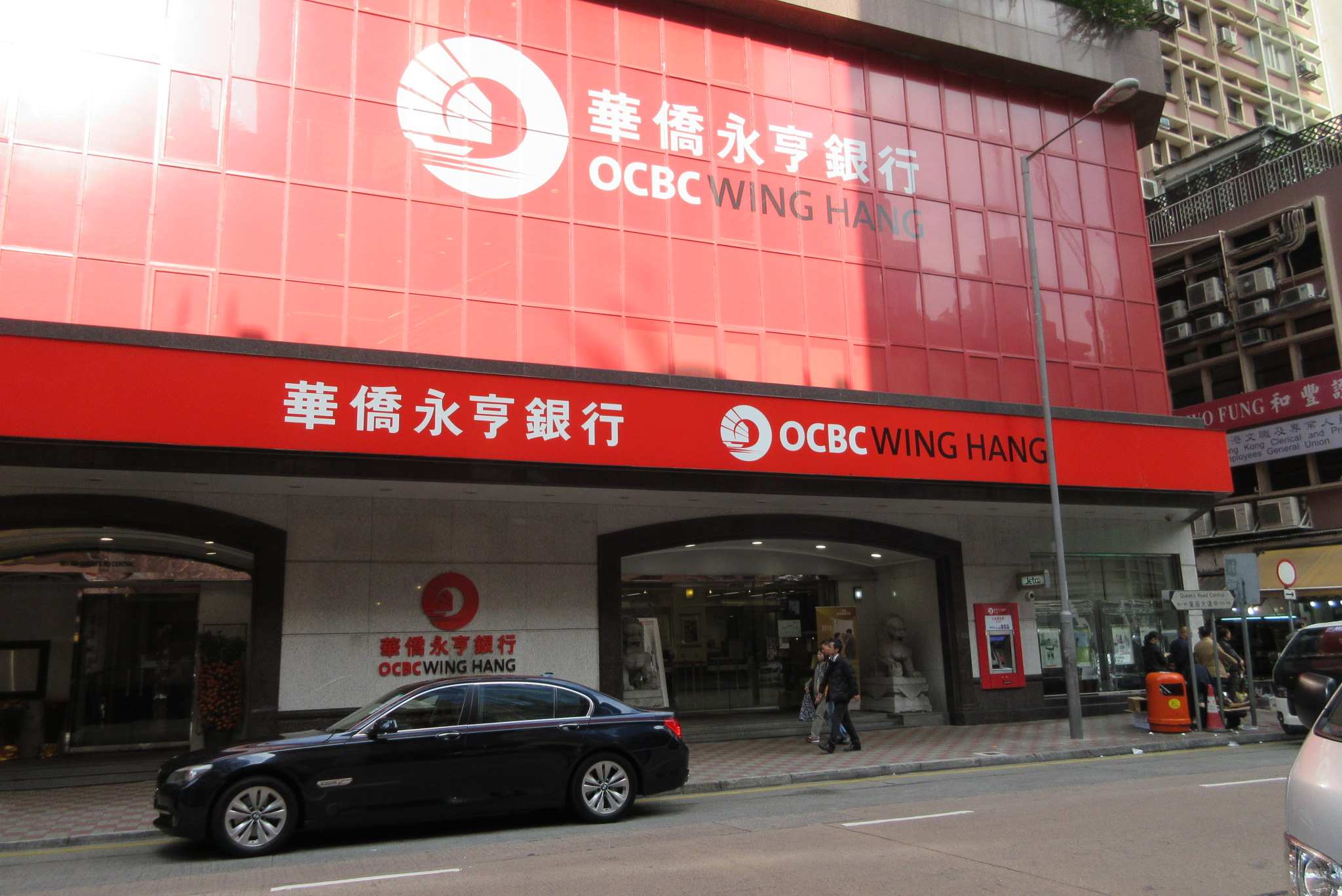
OCBC Bank (Hong Kong) Main Branch in Sheung Wan before the renaming in 2023.

Y K Fung established Wing Hang Ngan Ho in 1937 in Canton (Guangzhou) to engage in money changing. Its early years were difficult due to the turbulent political and economic conditions in China. In 1941, the firm established a subsidiary, Banco Weng Hang, in Macau.

In 1945, Wing Hang Ngan Ho re-established itself in Hong Kong with a capital of HK$300,000 and a staff of nineteen. The firm prospered during the post-war boom and was incorporated in 1960 as Wing Hang Bank.

In 1973, the Irving Trust Company of New York acquired a majority interest in Wing Hang. In 1979, the Head Office Building was re-developed to provide modern facilities for its operations.

In 1988, the Bank of New York merged with Irving Bank Corporation after a year-long takeover bid by the Bank of New York. In July 1993, Wing Hang Bank listed its shares on the Hong Kong Stock Exchange. In August 2004, Wing Hang completed the merger with Chekiang First Bank. In January 2007, the bank acquired Inchroy Credit Corporation, a major financial institution engaged in the hire purchase and lease financing business.

In July 2007, The Bank of New York Company Inc. merged with Mellon Financial Corporation to form The Bank of New York Mellon Corporation. That same year, Wing Hang established Wing Hang Bank (China).

=== Acquisition by OCBC ===
OCBC Wing Hang logo used until 2023

Singapore's OCBC Bank acquired Wing Hang in 2014 for S$6.23 billion. Under the Hong Kong Companies Ordinance, OCBC Bank, with 97.52 percent of Wing Hang's shares, compulsorily acquired the bank on 29 July 2014. OCBC Wing Hang was subsequently delisted after the acquisition was completed.

On 1 October 2014, Wing Hang Bank was re-branded as OCBC Wing Hang to reflect its integration into the OCBC family. On 3 July 2023, OCBC unveiled a unified brand across its core markets, including Hong Kong and Macau, solidifying OCBC's One Group approach to capitalize on the ASEAN-Greater China opportunity. In Hong Kong, "OCBC Wing Hang Bank Limited" has changed its name to "OCBC Bank (Hong Kong) Limited" and in Macau, "Banco OCBC Weng Hang, S.A." has changed its name to "Banco OCBC (Macau), S.A.". "Wing Hang" is no longer in the legal names of both OCBC's Hong Kong and Macau subsidiaries.

OCBC has also launched a new unified logo for its banking entities. The logo retains the classic Chinese junk ship, which has been featured in every iteration of its logo since the bank was founded in 1932. The bank has also launched a new tagline: For now, and beyond (心所向, 行致遠).

== Management ==
=== Board of directors ===
The board comprises the chairman, one executive director, one non-executive directors and three non-executive independent directors.

- Chairman: Khoo Cheng Hoe Andrew
- Executive director:
  - Wang Ke – Chief Executive
- Non-executive directors
  - Wong Pik Kuen Helen
- Non-executive independent directors
  - Chim Wai Kin
  - Chong Chuan Neo
  - Hui Leung Wah, Herbert

== Operations ==
OCBC Bank (Hong Kong) Limited is the holding company and the principal operating company of the group. It provides banking and related financial services through the holding bank and its subsidiaries in Hong Kong and China.

In its Hong Kong operations, it runs two wealth management centers, five premier banking centers, with a total of twenty-two branches across Hong Kong.

Its wholly owned subsidiary in mainland China, OCBC Bank Limited (OCBC China), has a network of branches in Shenzhen, Guangzhou, Shanghai, Beijing, Chengdu, and Zhuhai. Through its other subsidiaries and affiliated companies, the Group provides nominee, deposit-taking, offshore banking, hire purchase, consumer financing, insurance, and share brokerage services.

== Subsidiaries ==
As of 30 April 2024, OCBC Bank (Hong Kong) Limited has five major subsidiaries:

- OCBC Bank Limited (OCBC China)
- Banco OCBC (Macau), S.A.
- OCBC Securities Brokerage (Hong Kong) Limited
- OCBC Insurance Brokers (Hong Kong) Limited
- OCBC Nominees Services (Hong Kong) Limited
