= OCBC Centre =

Office skyscraper in Singapore

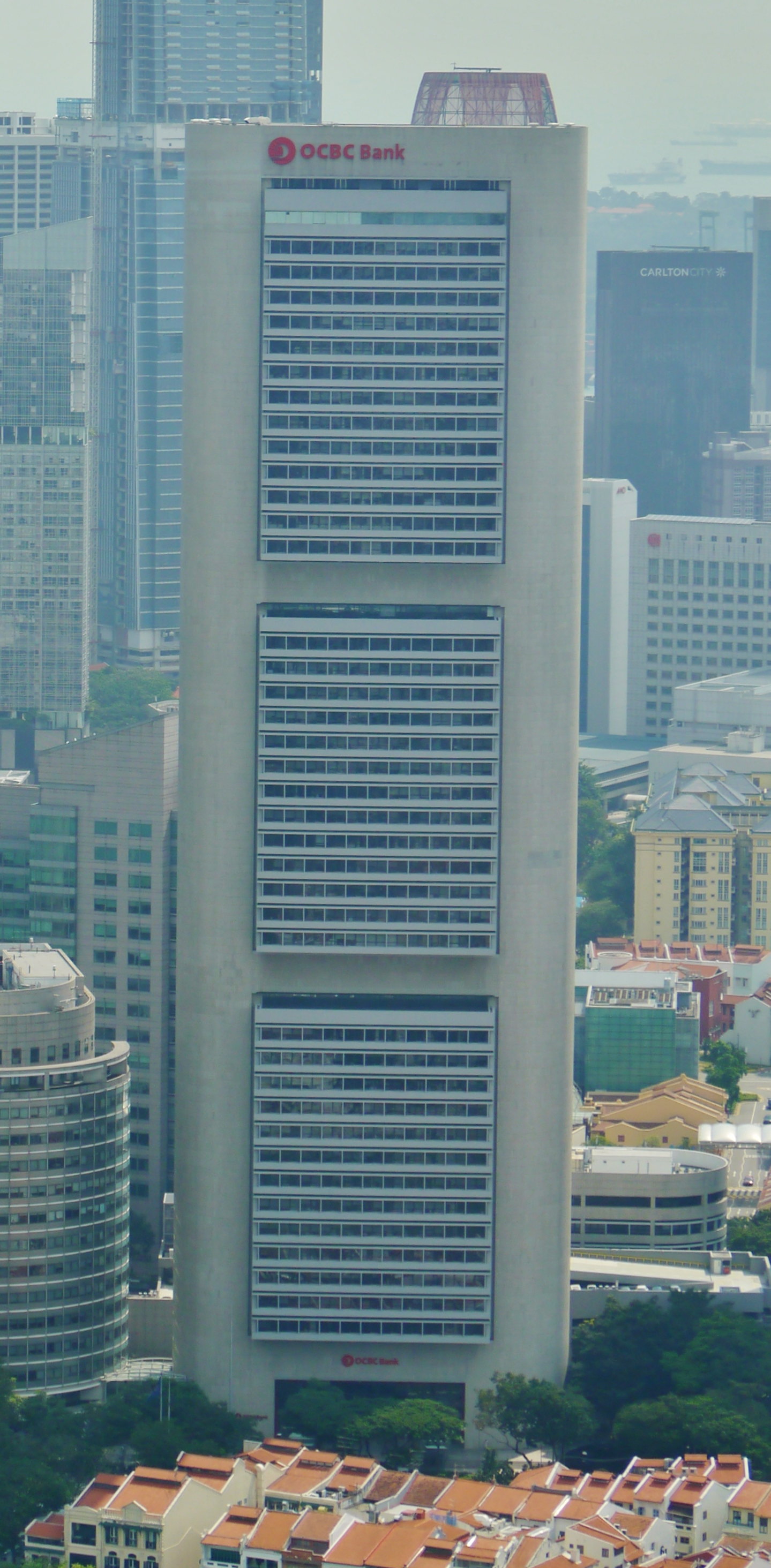

General information
- Type: Commercial offices
- Architectural style: Brutalist architecture
- Location: Downtown Core, Singapore, 65 Chulia Street, Singapore 049513
- Coordinates: 1.285°N 103.8491°E
- Construction started: 1975
- Completed: 1976
- Opened: 1 October 1976 (officially opening)
- Inaugurated: 1 October 1976
- Owner: OCBC Bank
- Operator: OCBC Bank

Height
- Roof: 197.7 m (649 ft)

Technical details
- Floor count: 52
- Floor area: 74,900 sq ft (6,960 m^{2})

Design and construction
- Architects: I. M. Pei; BEP Akitek
- Developer: OCBC Bank
- Structural engineer: Ove Arup & Partners
- Main contractor: Morrison-Knudsen; Low Keng Huat

OCBC Centre is a 197.7 m (649 ft), 52-storey skyscraper in Singapore currently serving as the headquarters of OCBC Bank.

== History ==
OCBC Centre was officially formally grand inauguration ceremonial took place on 1 October 1976 and was the second-tallest building in the country, and South East Asia, at that time. There are two extensions, OCBC Centre South and OCBC Centre East. There is an Executive Club on one of the higher floors of the building. OCBC Centre East has food and beverage outlets.

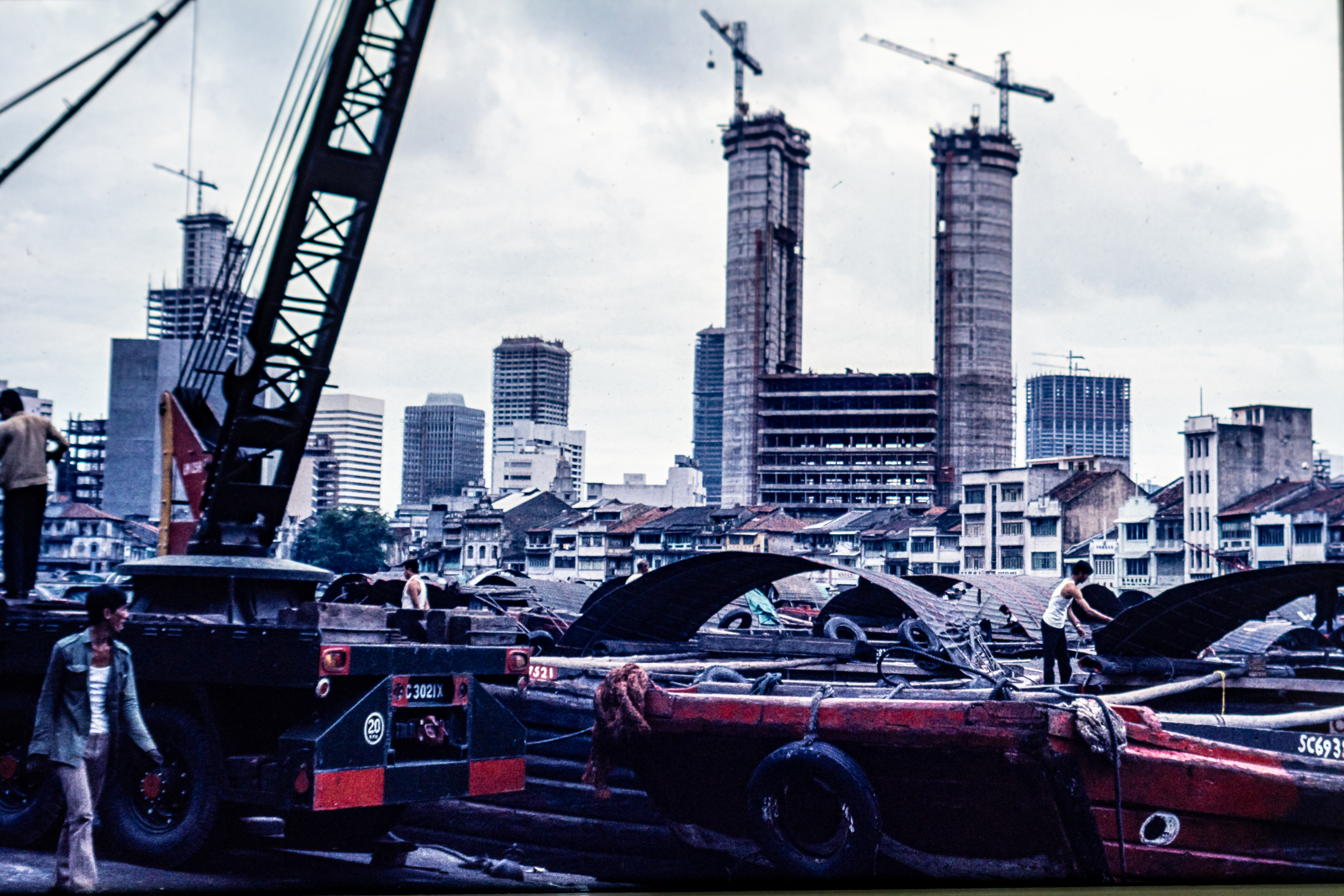
OCBC Centre under construction in 1973/74, viewed from Boat Quay.

== Architecture ==
Designed by renowned American architect I. M. Pei, OCBC Centre is a prominent example of Brutalist architecture, a popular architectural style in the 1960s and 70s.

OCBC Center building showing an alternative view from the intersection of Bomham street and Battery Road.

== Nesting peregrine falcons ==
In April 2024, a pair of Indo-pacific peregrine falcons (Falco peregrinus ernesti) laid eggs for the first time in Singapore. The eggs were laid on the side facing the Singapore River, on a concrete recess. This was not the ideal substrate for a nest, as peregrine falcon usually nest on loose gravel. Thus, this nesting was unsuccessful and the eggs were abandoned. The Singapore University of Technology and Design (SUTD) constructed a "claw-catcher" like mechanism, named Egg Retrieval and Nesting Enhancement Support Tool (ERNEST) to retrieve the eggs, which were collected in October 2025 and donated to Lee Kong Chian Natural History Museum (LKCNHM) for further research.

To provide a better nesting site, a tray filled with loose gravel was installed on the side of the building facing the Singapore River in November 2024. A CCTV system was also installed to allow researchers to observe the falcons' breeding cycle.

Upon further monitoring, it was observed that the falcons also used the recess on the other side facing Chinatown. Thus, on 11 January 2025, a second gravel tray was installed, along with a CCTV system. During this, 5 older eggs and 2 newer eggs were discovered. The older eggs were donated to LKCNHM, and the 2 newer eggs were placed into the newly installed gravel tray. However, these newer eggs were also eventually abandoned. These eggs were sent to Mandai Wildlife Group for incubation, but were removed due to degradation in one, and lack of development in the other. Post-mortem examinations revealed no fertilization.

In mid January, the second clutch of the year was laid on the concrete recess facing Chinatown. However, the three eggs were soon eaten, possibly due to unideal nesting conditions, damage, or food scarcity.

In late February to early March, 3 eggs were laid in the gravel tray facing the Singapore River. As falcons typically only lay two to three clutches a year, this was likely the last attempt for 2025. The first chick hatched on 6 April, and the second on 9 April, while the third egg did not hatch and was sent to LKCNHM. After about 3 weeks, the chicks were ringed to aid in future identification and research. The chicks fledged on 18 May and 21 May.

== See also ==
- List of tallest buildings in Singapore
