= List of insurance companies in India =

Following is the list of insurance companies in India which have been approved by the Insurance Regulatory and Development Authority of India (IRDAI) which is a statutory body regulating and promoting the insurance and reinsurance industries in India.There are three types of Insurance Companies in India which are as given below:

== Life insurance companies ==
As of 1 April 2025, IRDAI has recognized 26 life insurance companies. Following is the list:

List is arranged chronologically based on their recognition by IRDAI
#	Company	Sector	Headquarters	Founded
1	Life Insurance Corporation of India	Public	Mumbai	1956
2	HDFC bank	Private	Mumbai	2000
3	Axis Max Life Insurance Co. Ltd.	Private	Delhi	2000
4	ICICI Life Insurance Limited	Private	Mumbai	2000
5	Kotak Life Insurance Co. Ltd.	Private	Mumbai	2001
6	Aditya Birla Sun Life Insurance Co. Ltd.	Private	Mumbai	2000
7	TATA AIA Life Insurance Co. Ltd.	Private	Mumbai	2001
8	SBI Life Insurance Co. Ltd.	Public	Mumbai	2001
9	Bajaj Allianz Life Insurance Co. Ltd.	Private	Pune	2001
10	PNB MetLife India Insurance Co. Ltd.	Private	Mumbai	2001
11	Reliance Nippon Life Insurance Company	Private	Mumbai	2001
12	Aviva Life Insurance Company India Ltd.	Private	Gurugram	2002
13	Sahara India Life Insurance Co. Ltd.	Private	Lucknow	2004
14	Shriram Life Insurance Co. Ltd.	Private	Hyderabad	2005
15	Bharti AXA Life Insurance Co. Ltd.	Private	Mumbai	2008
16	Generali Central Life Insurance Co. Ltd.	Private	Mumbai	2007
17	Ageas Federal Life Insurance Co. Ltd.	Private	Mumbai	2008
18	Canara HSBC Life Insurance Co. Ltd.	Private	Gurugram	2008
19	Bandhan Life Insurance Co. Ltd.	Private	Mumbai	2008
20	Pramerica Life Insurance Co. Ltd.	Private	Gurugram	2008
21	Star Union Dai-ichi Life Insurance	Private	Mumbai	2008
22	IndiaFirst Life Insurance Co. Ltd.	Private	Mumbai	2009
23	Edelweiss Life Insurance Co. Ltd.	Private	Mumbai	2011
24	Credit Access Life Insurance limited	Private	Bengaluru	2023
25	Acko Life Insurance Limited	Private	Bengaluru	2023
26	Go Digit Life Insurance Limited	Private	Pune	2023

== Non Life insurance companies ==
As of 1 April 2025, IRDAI has recognized 33 non-life insurance companies of which 6 are standalone health insurance companies.

	Company	Sector	Headquarters	Founded
1	Acko General Insurance	Private	Mumbai	2016
2	Aditya Birla Health Insurance	Private	Mumbai	2015
3	Agriculture Insurance Company of India	Govt.	New Delhi	2002
4	Bajaj Allianz General Insurance	Private	Pune	2001
5	Cholamandalam MS General Insurance	Private	Chennai	2001
6	Manipal Cigna Health Insurance Company Limited	Private	Mumbai	2014
7	Navi General Insurance Limited	Private	Bengaluru	2016
8	Go Digit Insurance	Private	Pune	2017
9	Zuno General Insurance	Private	Mumbai	2017
10	ECGC Limited	Govt.	Mumbai	1957
11	Future Generali India Insurance	Private	Mumbai	2007
12	HDFC ERGO General Insurance Company	Private	Mumbai	2002
13	ICICI Lombard	Private	Mumbai	2001
14	IFFCO TOKIO General Insurance	Private	Gurugram	2000
15	Zurich Kotak General Insurance	Private	Mumbai	2015
16	Liberty General Insurance	Private	Mumbai	2013
17	Magma General Insurance	Private	Mumbai	2009
18	Niva Bupa Health Insurance	Private	New Delhi	2008
19	National Insurance Company	Govt.	Kolkata	1906
20	New India Assurance	Govt.	Mumbai	1919
21	Raheja QBE General Insurance	Private	Mumbai	2007
22	Reliance General Insurance	Private	Mumbai	2000
23	Care Health Insurance Ltd	Private	Gurugram	2012
24	Royal Sundaram General Insurance	Private	Chennai	2000
25	SBI General Insurance	Private	Mumbai	2010
26	Shriram General Insurance	Private	Jaipur	2008
27	Star Health and Allied Insurance	Private	Chennai	2006
28	Tata AIG General Insurance	Private	Mumbai	2001
29	The Oriental Insurance Company	Govt.	New Delhi	1947
30	United India Insurance Company	Govt.	Chennai	1938
31	Universal Sompo General Insurance Company	Private	Mumbai	2007
32	Kshema General Insurance Limited	Private	Hyderabad	2023
33	Galaxy Health Insurance Co Ltd	Private	Chennai	2023

== Reinsurance companies ==
On 1 April 2025, IRDAI reinsnised the first private reinsurer ending state-monopoly of GIC Re since 1972.

	Company	Sector	Headquarters	Founded
1	General Insurance Corporation of India	Govt.	Mumbai	1972
2	Valueattics Re	Private	Bangalore	

== Health insurance ==
	Company	Sector	Headquarters	Founded
1	HDFC ERGO General Insurance Company	Private	Mumbai	
2	Star Health and Allied Insurance	Private	Chennai	
3	ICICI Lombard	Private	Mumbai	
4	Niva Bupa Health Insurance	Private	New Delhi	
5	Care Health Insurance Ltd	Private	Gurugram	
6	Aditya Birla Health Insurance	Private	Mumbai	
7	Tata AIG General Insurance	Private	Mumbai	
8	Zurich Kotak General Insurance	Private	Mumbai	
9	Bajaj Allianz General Insurance	Private	Pune	
11	IFFCO TOKIO General Insurance	Private	Gurugram	
11	New India Assurance	Govt.	Mumbai	
12	Universal Sompo General Insurance Company	Private	Mumbai	
13	Cholamandalam MS General Insurance	Private	Chennai	
14	Go Digit Insurance	Private	Pune	
15	Reliance General Insurance	Private	Mumbai	
16	Manipal Cigna Health Insurance Company Limited	Private	Mumbai	
