= Life insurance in India =

Life insurance is one of the growing sectors in India since 2000 as Government allowed Private players and FDI up to 26% and recently Cabinet approved a proposal to increase it to 49%. In 1955, mean risk per policy of Indian and foreign life insurers amounted respectively to ₹2,950 & ₹7,859 (worth ₹15 lakh & ₹41 lakh in 2017 prices). Life Insurance in India was nationalised by incorporating Life Insurance Corporation (LIC) in 1956. All private life insurance companies at that time were taken over by LIC. In 1993, the Government of India appointed RN Malhotra Committee to lay down a road map for privatisation of the life insurance sector.

== Types of life insurance in India ==
- Unit-linked insurance plan

== Companies ==
Below are the list of life insurance companies in India:

- Life Insurance Corporation of India
- HDFC Life
- ICICI Life Insurance Limited
- Bajaj Life Insurance
- Kotak Life Insurance
- SBI Life Insurance Company
- Axis Max Life Insurance
- Reliance Life Insurance
- Canara HSBC Life Insurance
- Aviva India
- Bandhan_Life
- PNB MetLife India Insurance Company
- Bharti AXA Life Insurance Co. Ltd.
- Aditya Birla Sun Life Insurance Co. Ltd.
- Pramerica Life Insurance Co. Ltd.
- Edelweiss Life Insurance Co. Ltd
- Future Generali India Life Insurance Co. Ltd.
- Sahara India Life Insurance Co. Ltd.
- Shriram Life Insurance Co. Ltd.
- Star Union Dai-ichi Life Insurance
- Tata AIA Life Insurance Co. Ltd.
