= Aegon (disambiguation) =

Aegon N.V. is a Dutch multinational life insurance, pensions and asset management company

Aegon may also refer to:

- Aegon UK, subsidiary company
- Aegon Life Insurance Company
- Ægon, a playable character in Marvel Contest of Champions
- Several fictional characters in George R.R. Martin's A Song of Ice and Fire novels; see Aegon Targaryen
