= Canara HSBC Life Insurance =

Indian Insurance company

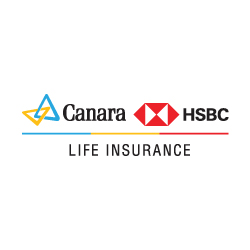
- Type: Public
- Traded as: NSE: CANHLIFE; BSE: 544583
- Industry: Life insurance
- Founded: 2008
- Headquarters: Gurgaon, Haryana, India
- Area served: Worldwide
- Key people: Anuj Mathur (MD & CEO); Tarun Rustagi (CFO); Sachin Dutta (COO)
- Products: Life insurance; Term life insurance; Unit-linked insurance plan; Endowment policy; Money-back policy; Whole life insurance; Retirement plans
- Owner: Canara Bank (36.5%); HSBC Insurance (Asia Pacific) (26%); Punjab National Bank (13%)
- Website: www.canarahsbclife.com

Canara HSBC Life Insurance is an Indian life insurance company, headquartered in Gurugram. Established in 2008, Canara HSBC Life Insurance was a joint venture between Canara Bank (36.5%), HSBC Insurance (Asia Pacific) Holdings Limited (26%) and Punjab National Bank (23%). On 15 June 2022, the company renamed itself as Canara HSBC Life Insurance after the exit of its third partner, Punjab National Bank.

The company provides life, health, online term plans, credit life and employee benefit segments.

== History and overview ==
The company was established in 2008. In February 2014, Canara HSBC Life Insurance introduced the concept of online revival of the policy, enabling customers to reinstate a lapsed policy and allowing them to pay their premium online.

It partnered with 3 rural regional banks, Pragathi Gramin Bank in Karnataka and Shreyas Gramin Bank in Uttar Pradesh in 2009 and South Malabar Gramin Bank in 2010. The company partnered with Dhanlaxmi Bank in June 2017. It also tied up with Can Fin Homes and IndianMoneyInsurance.com. In April 2020, Oriental Bank of Commerce merged with Punjab National Bank. On 15 June 2022, the company rebranded as Canara HSBC Life Insurance.

== See also ==
- List of insurance companies in India
