= IndusInd Capital =

Indian Financial Services company

- Formerly: Reliance Capital & Finance Trust Limited (1986 - 1995); Reliance Capital Limited (1995 - 2025)
- Type: Private
- Industry: Financial services
- Founded: 5 March 1986; 40 years ago
- Founder: Dhirubhai Ambani
- Headquarters: DAKC, Navi Mumbai, India
- Key people: Shri Arun Tiwari (Chairman) Shri Roopam Asthana (CEO)
- Products: Asset management; Mutual funds; Life insurance; General insurance; Commercial finance; Stock broking; Wealth management; Private equity
- Revenue: ▲₹24,443 crore (US$2.5 billion) (2024)
- Operating income: ▲₹477 crore (US$50 million) (2024)
- Net income: ▲₹432 crore (US$45 million) (2024)
- Total assets: ▲₹74,986 crore (US$7.8 billion) (2024)
- Total equity: ▲₹−11,127 crore (US$−1.2 billion) (2024)
- Number of employees: 18,360 (2021)
- Parent: IndusInd International Holdings Ltd (Hinduja Group)
- Subsidiaries: IndusInd Nippon Life Insurance; IndusInd General Insurance; IndusInd Securities
- Website: www.indusindcapital.com

IndusInd Capital Limited (formerly Reliance Capital) is an Indian financial services company.

It has businesses in asset management, mutual funds, life insurance and general insurance, commercial finance, home finance, stock broking, wealth management services, distribution of financial products, private equity, asset reconstruction, proprietary investments and other activities in financial services.

== History ==
IndusInd Capital was incorporated in 1986 at Ahmedabad in Gujarat as Reliance Capital & Finance Trust Limited. After its name was changed to Reliance Capital (RC) on January 5, 1995, it obtained its registration as a non-banking company (NBFC) in December 1998.

Having shifted its registered office to Jamnagar in Gujarat, Reliance Capital finally moved to Mumbai in Maharashtra four years later. In 2006, it merged with Reliance Capital Ventures, increasing its shareholder base from 0.15 million to 1.3 million.

RC entered the capital market with a maiden public issue in 1990 and in subsequent years further tapped the capital market through rights issue and public issues. Initially listed on the Ahmedabad and Mumbai Stock Exchanges, its equity shares are listed on the latter and on the National Stock Exchange of India.

In 2019, auditors of PwC resigned claiming that they were not allowed to carry on their audits if Reliance prevented it from exercising independent judgment in making a report to the members of the company. Although RC denied any wrongdoing, auditors revealed that the recoverable amount of ₹7083 crore was in fact misappropriated intercorporate deposits from other Reliance firms.

The Indian firm had Anil Ambani as its promoter and chairman until November 2021, when the Reserve Bank of India (RBI) superseded the RC board in view of payment defaults and serious governance issues.

In December 2025, nine months after being sold to the Hinduja Group, the company changed its name to IndusInd Capital Limited.

== Operations ==
Reliance Capital's prominent businesses are as follows:

=== Reliance General Insurance ===
Reliance General Insurance Company Limited
- Type: Private
- Industry: Insurance
- Founded: 2001
- Headquarters: Mumbai, India
- Key people: Rakesh Jain, Executive Director and CEO
- Products: General, vehicle, health, travel, and home insurance
- Parent: Reliance Capital
- Website: www.reliancegeneral.co.in

Reliance General Insurance Company Limited is an Indian insurance company, part of Reliance Capital Ltd. The firm has a 7.3% market share in the private sector and has the largest agency channel, with over 24,500 agents. The CEO and Executive Director is Rakesh Jain.

The company has strengthened and diversified its distribution network by forging partnerships with major banks. Reliance General Insurance is an active participant in various government crop insurance schemes, including the Pradhan Mantri Fasal Bima Yojna, and has insured over 3 million farmers under this financial inclusion initiative. The total gross written premium (GWP) for the year which ended 31 March 2017, was ₹40.07 billion (US$420 million). Reliance General Insurance (RGI) offers insurance for auto, health, home, property, travel, marine, commercial and other specialty products.

=== Reliance Commercial Finance ===
Reliance Commercial Finance is among the leading lenders in the Indian non-banking finance sector. The CEO and Executive Director of the company is Devang Mody.

The company has an operational presence of over 44 locations in India and an AUM of 16759 Cr. as in March 2017. Reliance Commercial Finance offers a wide range of products which include business expansion loans, property loans, vehicle loans, construction equipment loans, infrastructure, microfinance and agriculture loans. The company had a loan book at ₹124.36 billion (US$2.1 billion) as on 31 March 2017, with over 268,278 customers (including microfinance) across India.

=== Reliance Home Finance Limited ===
Ravindra Sudhalkar is the CEO and Executive Director of the company.

Reliance Home Finance Limited (RHF), a 100% subsidiary of Reliance Capital, provides home loans, LAP, construction finance, and affordable housing loans. The company has over 1,750 distributors serving over 33,300 customers across 90 locations, through a hub and spoke model, across the country.

The company filed for IPO in 2017 and the shares got listed on National Stock Exchange of India Limited and BSE Limited in the same year. The stock price recorded a fall of more than 95% within 2 years of its IPO.

=== Reliance Securities ===
Reliance Securities, the broking and distribution arm of Reliance Capital, is one of India's leading retail broking houses. B Gopkumar is the Chief Executive Officer and Executive Director of its broking and distribution business.

The distribution business has approximately 80 branches across India.

=== Reliance Asset Reconstruction ===
Reliance Asset Reconstruction is an asset reconstruction company, the principal sponsor/shareholder of which is Reliance Group (through Reliance Capital). The AUM as on 31 March 2017, stands at Rs. 1,829 crore (previous year: Rs. 1488 crore).

=== Reliance Health Insurance ===
Ravi Vishwanath is the CEO and Executive Director of Reliance Health Insurance.

Reliance Health Insurance is a Standalone Health Insurance Company promoted solely by Reliance Capital It was established on 7 May 2017. The company is headquartered in Mumbai, Maharashtra and has started operations on 10 December 2018.

== Major deals ==
In 2011, Reliance Capital sold 26% stake in its life insurance business, Reliance Life Insurance, to Nippon Life Insurance (Nissay), amongst the world's largest life insurers, with an AUM of over $600 billion. The transaction was completed at Rs. 3,082 crore for a 26 per cent stake, valuing Reliance Life Insurance at $2.6 billion.

In 2012, Nippon Life Insurance bought 26% stake in Reliance Capital Asset Management for Rs. 1,450 crore.

Reports indicate that Reliance Capital is also planning to sell a 26% stake in its general insurance business, Reliance General Insurance, at an appropriate time. India's leading financial daily Economic Times wrote, "Since Reliance General Insurance is one of the leading players with 8.4 per cent market share, the proposed stake sale is expected to generate handsome capital gains for Reliance Capital... Besides de-leveraging the balance sheet, the ongoing restructuring should also help Reliance Capital conserve capital and generate better return ratios."

Reliance Capital in July 2014 announced the merger of its global film and media services business with Prime Focus to create an entity with a combined turnover of over Rs 1,800 crore.

In July 2017, it sold its 1% share in Paytm to China's Alibaba Group for Rs 275 crore, making a profit of 2,600%.

In September 2019, it sold 21.54% stake in Reliance Nippon Life Asset Management to Nippon Life Insurance Company alongside completely exiting its entire stake in wholly owned subsidiaries Reliance Capital Trustee Co and Reliance Capital AIF Trustee Company.

== See also ==
- Nippon Life
