= Hang Seng Insurance =

Insurance company

- Company type: Subsidiary
- Industry: Insurance & Financial Services
- Founded: January 15, 1965; 60 years ago
- Headquarters: Hong Kong
- Products: Insurance
- Owner: Hang Seng Bank
- Website: www.hangseng.com/en-hk/personal/insurance-mpf/

Hang Seng Insurance Company Limited is a Hong Kong insurance company that is a wholly owned subsidiary of Hang Seng Bank.

The company traces its origins back to 1965 and was Hong Kong first insurance company specialising in "bancassurance". The company primarily offers a diversified range of personal insurance products, including accident, health, and life insurance, to individual and corporate customers through Hang Seng Bank online and offline channels in Hong Kong. Leveraging Hang Seng Bank extensive local marketing network, Hang Seng Insurance has become one of the major insurance providers in the Hong Kong market.

As of the first quarter of 2025, Hang Seng Insurance market share in new direct individual life insurance business has risen from third place in 2024 to second place, making it the second largest life insurance company in Hong Kong by market share (the largest being HSBC Insurance, also part of the Hang Seng Bank ultimately group).

== History ==
The Associated Bankers Insurance Company Limited was established on the 15 January 1965, by major Chinese banks and other social elites. These were Hang Seng Bank, together with Chinese banks in Hong Kong — Bank of East Asia, Wing Lung Bank (later acquired by China Merchants Bank), and Wing Hang Bank (later acquired by Singapore OCBC). The company officially commenced business on 16 March 1965. It was Hong Kong first insurance company specialising in "bancassurance", focusing on general insurance business such as fire, water, and accident insurance for bank clients.

In 1985, Hang Seng Bank purchased shares of Associated Bankers Insurance from minority shareholders for HKD 110 million, increasing its shareholding from 21.5% to 68.8%, to strengthen business ties between Hang Seng Bank and Associated Bankers Insurance.

In 1992, Hang Seng Bank continued to hold approximately 68.83% equity interest in Associated Bankers Insurance.

In February 1993, Hang Seng Bank proposed to acquire all the remaining 2,623,624 ordinary shares of Associated Bankers Insurance not yet held by it at a price of HKD 171.65 per share, for a total consideration of approximately HKD 450.3 million. The aim was to make Associated Bankers Insurance a wholly owned subsidiary. This offer involved interests held by certain directors, including eight Hang Seng Bank directors collectively holding 11.7% of Associated Bankers Insurance shares, and two directors of Associated Bankers Insurance holding 0.2%. Hang Cheong Investment Limited (not part of the group) also held 13.1% of the shares.

On 6 March 1993, Associated Bankers Insurance became a wholly owned subsidiary of Hang Seng Bank, and on 13 March 1996 it was renamed Hang Seng Insurance Company Limited.

In 1995, Hang Seng Insurance and HSBC Insurance jointly established Hang Seng Life Limited to develop life insurance business for the Hang Seng Bank Group.

In September 2007, the company acquired the 50% stake held by HSBC Insurance (Asia Pacific) in Hang Seng Life for approximately HKD 2.4 billion, thereby gaining full ownership and making it a wholly owned subsidiary. Prior to this, Hang Seng Insurance and HSBC Insurance each held half of Hang Seng Life shares.

In March 2012, Hang Seng Bank announced the sale of its general insurance subsidiary — Hang Seng General Insurance (Hong Kong) (formerly Bankers Alliance Insurance, a member of Associated Bankers Insurance) — to Australian insurer QBE Insurance Group (QBE) for approximately US$420 million. The company was subsequently renamed QBE Insurance (Hong Kong) (and later in 2024 transferred to QBE Hongkong & Shanghai Insurance), and a 10-year exclusive general insurance distribution agreement was signed with QBE Group; In July 2023, following the expiry of the distribution agreement with QBE, Hang Seng Bank signed a new exclusive 15-year general insurance distribution agreement with Chubb.

== Performance ==
Performance of Hang Seng Insurance (2022–2024)
Year	Premiums written^{d}		Premiums received^{b}		Insurance revenue^{d}		Net profit		Total asset	
Year	Related	Change	Related	Change	Related	Change	Related	Change	Related	Change
2024	34,052	21.34%	33,490	67.01%	3,300	14.53%	2,412	31.65%	206,347	11.47%
2023	20,814	-	20,052	-	2,881	-	1,832	-	185,118	-
Notes： a）All figures are presented in millions of Hong Kong dollars for comparison purposes. b）Premiums received reflect only direct underwriting and exclude inward or outward reinsurance. Premiums received are a cash-based concept, referring solely to the premiums actually collected within a given period. c）“Insurance revenue” and “premiums written” are two distinct accounting concepts. With the adoption of IFRS 17, “insurance revenue” has replaced the traditional “premiums written” as the core income indicator in insurers’ financial statements. The key difference is that insurance revenue excludes the deposit component of premiums and is recognized over the period during which insurance services are provided, whereas premiums written represents the total amount of premiums contractually committed through policies or endorsements issued during a given period, regardless of whether the premiums have been collected. The former reflects the accounting treatment of revenue recognition, while the latter provides a more intuitive measure of an insurer’s market size and market share.

== See also ==
- HSBC Life
- List of insurance companies in Hong Kong
