= Sundaram Finance =

Indian financial services company

Sundram Finance Limited
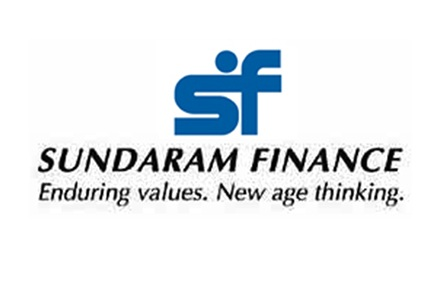
- Type: Public
- Traded as: NSE: SUNDARMFIN; BSE: 590071
- Industry: Financial services
- Founded: 1954; 72 years ago
- Founder: T.S.Santhanam
- Headquarters: Chennai, Tamil Nadu, India
- Key people: Anand Radhakrishnan, (Managing Director)
- Products: Mutual funds, Mortgage loans, Insurance, SME finance;
- Revenue: ▲₹4,722 crore (US$490 million) (2020)
- Operating income: ▲₹3,443 crore (US$360 million) (2020)
- Net income: ▲₹805 crore (US$84 million) (2020)
- Total assets: ▲₹44,720 crore (US$4.6 billion) (2020)
- Website: www.sundaramfinance.in

Sundaram Finance Limited is an Indian financial and investment service provider, based in Chennai. The company offers consumer loans, wealth management, commercial finance, investment banking, private equity, treasury advisory, credit cards and infrastructure finance, among others.

Sundaram Finance Limited was established in 1954. The company is registered with the Reserve Bank of India (RBI), as a Systematically Important Deposit Accepting Non-Banking Financial Company. As of December 2017, the company has a market capitalisation of ₹26,000 crore and operates through more than 640 branches across the country.

== Subsidiaries and joint venture ==
The company has six subsidiaries and manages assets worth ₹69 billion (US$720 million) and has over 4,000 employees as of March 2017. Through various subsidiaries, the group is in the business of life insurance, asset management, private equity, corporate finance, structured finance, insurance broking, wealth management, equity broking, currency broking, commodity broking, financial advisory services, housing finance, pension fund management and health insurance.

In 2017–18, Sundaram Finance demerged its non-financial investments in automotive and manufacturing businesses into a separate company called Sundaram Finance Holdings Limited (SFHL). SFHL holds minority stakes in a number of TVS Group companies including Sundaram Clayton, Turbo Energy, Wheels India, Brakes India and Axles India.

The six subsidiaries of Sundaram Finance are:

- Sundaram Business Services
- Sundaram Home Finance (formerly Sundaram BNP Paribas Home Finance)
- Sundaram Asset Management Company
- Sundaram Fund Services
- Sundaram Trustee Company
- LGF Services
- Sundaram Finance also has a 50% stake in Royal Sundaram General Insurance, a joint venture with Ageas (40% stake) and Indian investors (10% stake).

In October 2025, Sundaram Finance Holdings was demerged from Sundaram Finance as TSF Investments.
