= TM Asia Life =

Asian insurance company

TM Asia Life is a general and life insurance company. It has offices in Malaysia, Singapore and Brunei. The company's insurance plans include i-intellectual, a regular premium investment-linked policy; and TM Legacy Plus, a limited-payment whole life policy which has a minimum benefit feature that increases a policy's sum assured depending on the entry age of the policyholder.
