= IndusInd General Insurance =

Indian insurance company

IndusInd General Insurance Company Limited
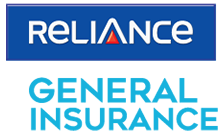
- Formerly: Reliance General Insurance Company Limited (2000 - 2025)
- Type: Private
- Industry: Financial services
- Founded: 17 August 2000; 26 years ago
- Founders: Anil Ambani
- Headquarters: Westin, Goregaon, Mumbai, India
- Key people: Sharad Mathur (MD & CEO); Hemant K Jain (CFO); Prabhdeep Batra (CMO); Raman Arora (COO)
- Products: General insurance Health insurance Vehicle insurance Travel insurance Home insurance Crop insurance Marine insurance
- Number of employees: 7,233 (2024)
- Parent: IndusInd Capital
- Website: www.indusindinsurance.com

IndusInd General Insurance Company Limited formerly Reliance General Insurance Company Limited is a private general insurance company and a subsidiary of Reliance Capital, part of the Hinduja Group. Founded in 2000, it is headquartered in Mumbai, India. As of March 2023, the company operates through a distribution network comprising over 131 branches and more than 75,000 intermediaries.

As of April 2017, it held a 7.3% market share in the private sector. It is the 5th largest private general insurance company in India, with a 4.43% share in the overall general insurance market.

== History ==
IndusInd General Insurance was incorporated on 17 August 2000 as Reliance General Insurance. The company obtained its license to operate in the general insurance sector from the Insurance Regulatory and Development Authority of India (IRDAI) on 23 October 2000. Reliance General Insurance is a 100% subsidiary of Reliance Capital Limited, a diversified financial services holding company which was promoted by Reliance Group till 2025.

The company has participated in various government crop insurance initiatives, including the Pradhan Mantri Fasal Bima Yojana. In FY 2016-2017, the company provided insurance coverage to over 3 million farmers as part of this financial inclusion initiative.

In September 2022, the company partnered with the Unique Identification Authority of India (UIDAI) to implement Aadhaar-based e-KYC services, enabling paperless identity verification and real-time claims processing.

In April 2023, Reliance General Insurance partnered with YES Bank to become the first general insurer in India to accept premium payments using the Reserve Bank of India's Central Bank Digital Currency, e-Rupee.

In May 2023, the Insurance Regulatory and Development Authority approved the transfer of shares in Reliance Capital's insurance subsidiaries, including Reliance General Insurance, Reliance Health Insurance, and Reliance Nippon Life Insurance, to the Hinduja Group's Aasia Enterprises, as part of the insolvency resolution process. The transfer had faced delays due to concerns over the proposed structure but was cleared after discussions.

In July 2023, the company raised ₹200 crore by issuing equity shares to its parent company, Reliance Capital, to support its solvency margin.

In August 2023, Reliance General Insurance was awarded the contract to implement the Megha Health Insurance Scheme and the Ayushman Bharat Pradhan Mantri Jan Arogya Yojana (Phase 6) for the citizens of Meghalaya.

In the Forbes India Health Claim Settlement Ratio list for 2023-24, Reliance General Insurance reported a settlement ratio of 98.75%, with most claims settled within the first three months of initiation, placing it among the top private insurers in the sector. It has established a diversified distribution network through partnerships with multiple banks, including IndusInd Bank, Catholic Syrian Bank, Andhra Bank, and Bank of India.

== Products and services ==
IndusInd General Insurance offers insurance policies in categories such as car, two-wheeler, commercial vehicle, travel, home, office, personal accident, property, health, fire, engineering, and marine.

== Finance ==
In the quarter ending March 2024, Reliance General Insurance reported a net profit of ₹58.31 crore and revenue of ₹1,741.55 crore, with year-on-year growth of 1.13% and 16.21%, respectively. In the fiscal year 2023, Reliance General Insurance reported a turnover of ₹103,390 crore, marking a 9.88% increase from the previous year.

The company's Gross Written Premium for FY23 grew by 10%, rising from ₹9,504 crore in FY22 to ₹10,489 crore in FY23.

In March 2017, the company reported a 40% growth in gross written premium, reaching ₹4,007 crore, with a net worth of ₹1,257 crore. In the financial year 2013-14, Reliance General Insurance reported a net profit of ₹64.1 crore.

== Controversies ==
In connection with an investigation by the Central Bureau of Investigation, allegations were made regarding the involvement of unknown officials from the Finance Department of the Government of Jammu and Kashmir, who, in conspiracy with Trinity Reinsurance Brokers, Reliance General Insurance Company, and other unidentified public servants, were accused of criminal conspiracy and misconduct. The allegations suggested that the actions led to pecuniary advantage for the involved parties and caused wrongful loss to the state exchequer during the period 2017-2018.

In October 2023, Reliance General Insurance received GST notices totaling ₹922.6 crore from the Directorate General of GST Intelligence. The notices were related to issues regarding GST payments on re-insurance commissions, co-insurance premiums, and input tax credits.

== Awards and recognition ==
In 2021, the company received the Business Leader of the Year Award at the World Leadership Congress and Awards. It was also recognized as the Best General Insurance Company for Innovations at the 4th Insurance Alertss Conclave & Excellence Awards.

In 2021, Reliance General Insurance was awarded The Economic Times Best Brand Award for the third consecutive year. The company was ranked #1 in the list of top 10 health insurance brands based on customer loyalty, according to an IMRB report released in 2015.

== See also ==
- List of insurance companies in India
