= Avanti Fellows =

Indian non-profit organization

- Avanti Fellows
- Formation: 2010
- Founder: Akshay Saxena and Krishna Ramkumar
- Type: Nonprofit
- Location: India
- Region served: Mumbai, New Delhi, and Chennai
- Products: Education, Mentorship
- Co-CEO: Akshay Saxen
- Website: https://www.avantifellows.org/

Avanti Fellows is an Indian non-profit organization established in 2010 with a goal to level the playing field in education by providing a scalable, low-cost model for preparing students for competitive exams like the JEE and the NEET. Since its inception, Avanti Fellows worked in collaboration with public education systems across India to deliver education programs that combine peer-based learning, technology, and academic mentoring especially in rural and underserved communities in India.

== History ==
Avanti Fellows was co-founded in 2010 by Akshay Saxena and Krishna Ramkumar, both alumni of IIT Bombay. Saxena was inspired to start Avanti after seeing students from rural, low-income backgrounds excel despite limited resources. He began a mentorship program at IIT Bombay, which later became Avanti Fellows. Starting with a few government schools, the organization gradually expanded its reach by partnering with national and state education bodies, including the Navodaya Vidyalaya Samiti and state governments.

== Partnerships and funding ==
Avanti Fellows has partnerships where it received funding and support from organizations such as USAID, the Michael & Susan Dell Foundation, J.P. Morgan, Tata Trusts, Infosys Foundation, and others. In 2020, the organization received a combined grant of $4.5 million from USAID and philanthropic partners to support the expansion of its blended learning programs across India.

The organization has also collaborated with Tata AIG to launch a scholarship initiative supporting meritorious girls from underserved backgrounds to pursue undergraduate education in STEM fields. The Indian Directorate of Education (DoE) also signed a Memorandum of Understanding (MoU) with 'Avanti Fellows' to prepare students for entrance exams.

Avanti Fellows partnered with Jawahar Navodaya Vidyalaya (JNV) Puducherry, to implement a two-year intensive coaching program for high-performing rural students. In 2018 cohort, 20 out of 21 students from the school cleared the IIT-JEE (Main) exam.

== Impact ==
As of 2023, Avanti Fellows had reached more than 70,000 students across 29 states and union territories in India. The organization has supported students in gaining admission to engineering and medical colleges across India, including many who have secured placements in prestigious institutions such as the Indian Institutes of Technology (IITs) and top government medical colleges. In 2020, 26 out of 29 students at Jawahar Navodaya Vidyalaya (JNV) Puducherry cleared the JEE Advanced, with one student achieving an All-India Rank of 1562.

== Recognitions ==
Avanti Fellows and its co-founders received some awards. In its early years the organization was one of the winners of the Stanford BASES Social E-Challenge. In 2024, co-founder Akshay Saxena was recognized as Social Entrepreneur of the Year by the Schwab Foundation.
