= Logix Group =

Indian real estate company

- Type: Private
- Industry: Real estate
- Founded: 1997
- Founder: Shakti Nath
- Headquarters: Noida, India
- Key people: Shakti Nath, CMD; Meena Nath, Director; Vikram Nath, Director; Chandni Nath, Director
- Services: IT/ITES, Residential, Commercial
- Website: www.logixgroup.in

Logix Group is a real estate company headquartered in Noida, India.

== History ==
The company was founded by Shakti Nath in 1997. The group has expanded rapidly. The group has been a developer of IT parks and IT Special Economic Zones. The company has created more than 25 such IT spaces, and has furnished 4 million square feet of IT property.

The group has joint ventures with various funds and foreign direct investment partners like ICICI Prudential; Taib Capital – ACACIA, Bahrain, and Citi Property Investors (taken over by Apollo Global Management).

== Controversy ==
In 2025, Logix Buildwell Private Limited, part of the Logix Group, was involved in a legal dispute with the Noida Authority over the refund of ₹62 crore paid for a commercial plot in Sector 32, Noida. The company had earlier challenged the cancellation of the allotment, following which the Allahabad High Court directed a refund in 2022. After receiving the refund in 2023, Logix Buildwell later sought interest on the amount, claiming the waiver undertaking was given under duress. However, in October 2025, the Allahabad High Court dismissed the plea, holding that the company had voluntarily waived its right to claim interest and could not later change its position.
