= Tata AIA Life =

Indian Life Insurance and Joint Venture Company

Tata AIA
- Type: Joint venture
- Traded as: Tata AIA Life Insurance Company Ltd.
- Industry: Financial services
- Founded: 1 April 2001; 25 years ago
- Headquarters: Mumbai, India
- Area served: India, Dubai, USA
- Key people: Venkatachalam Iyer (CEO)
- Products: Term life insurance ULIP; Pension plan Savings Plans; Retirement Plans; Child Plans; NRI Plans
- Revenue: ▲₹25,692 crore (US$2.7 billion) (2024)
- Net income: ▲₹1,314 crore (US$140 million) (2024)
- Parent: Tata Sons (51%); AIA Group (49%)
- Website: tataaia.com

Tata AIA Life Insurance Company Limited is an Indian life insurance company and a joint venture between Tata Sons and the AIA Group. Currently operating across 18 markets in the Asia–Pacific region. Tata Sons holds a 51% stake in the venture, while the remaining 49% is owned by the AIA Group.

== History ==
Tata AIA Life Insurance Company Limited was licensed on 12 February 2001 and commenced operations in India on 1 April 2001. The company offers life insurance products, including term insurance, unit-linked insurance plans (ULIPs), pension plans, and other related products. Its offerings are distributed through multiple channels such as agents, brokers, and bancassurance partnerships, as well as direct channels including telemarketing and digital platforms.
