= Stonebridge International Insurance Ltd =

British insurance company

Stonebridge International Insurance
- Company type: Private company
- Industry: Insurance
- Founded: February 20, 1997; 28 years ago
- Founder: J.C. Penney Company Inc
- Headquarters: Maidenhead, United Kingdom
- Area served: Europe
- Products: Accident insurance, health insurance
- Owner: Global Premium Holdings
- Number of employees: 11 (2022)
- Website: www.stonebridge-insurance.com

Stonebridge International Insurance (Stonebridge) is a British insurance company with its head office in Maidenhead. The company was providing insurance in western Europe and is licensed in the United Kingdom and had passported to the European countries including Denmark, Finland, France, Germany, Ireland, Italy, Norway, Poland, Portugal, Spain, and Sweden. It provides a range of accident and health insurance products.

== History ==
Stonebridge International Insurance was founded in 1998 by Cornerstone International Holding Ltd. with its ultimate holding company being J.C. Penney Company as a pan-European insurance company. Stonebridge International Insurance Ltd was formed to provide a range of accident and health products.

On 18 June 2001, Dutch insurance company Aegon N.V. completed the purchase of J.C. Penney's Direct Marketing Services operations including the UK Group containing Cornerstone International. Stonebridge became part of AEGON Direct Marketing Services International and a member of the Aegon group of companies.

On 7 August 2014 the company was fined £8.3 million by UK regulators over tactics employed by companies which Stonebridge had outsourced the sale of many of their insurance policies to. These companies sold policies to some hundreds of thousands of people in the UK and Europe using telesales scripts that Stonebridge had provided, which the regulator said did not provide clear, fair and balanced information.

In 2018, Stonebridge was voted as one of the worst insurance companies for receiving complaints, using numbers gathered by the Financial Ombudsman Service, receiving 40 general insurance complaints.

In October 2020, Aegon sold Stonebridge to Global Premium Holdings for £60 million. Stonebridge had been closed for new business since 2014 and had around 200,000 customers in the U.K., Germany, France, Spain, Italy, the Nordics and Ireland. As part of this sale, the European business was moved to another member of the group. The operation of the business was taken over by Union Insurance Services the trading name of Union Income Benefit Holdings Ltd.. Stonebridge would refocus back on its core business of health and accident cover in the UK.
