= HSBC Life =

Insurance company

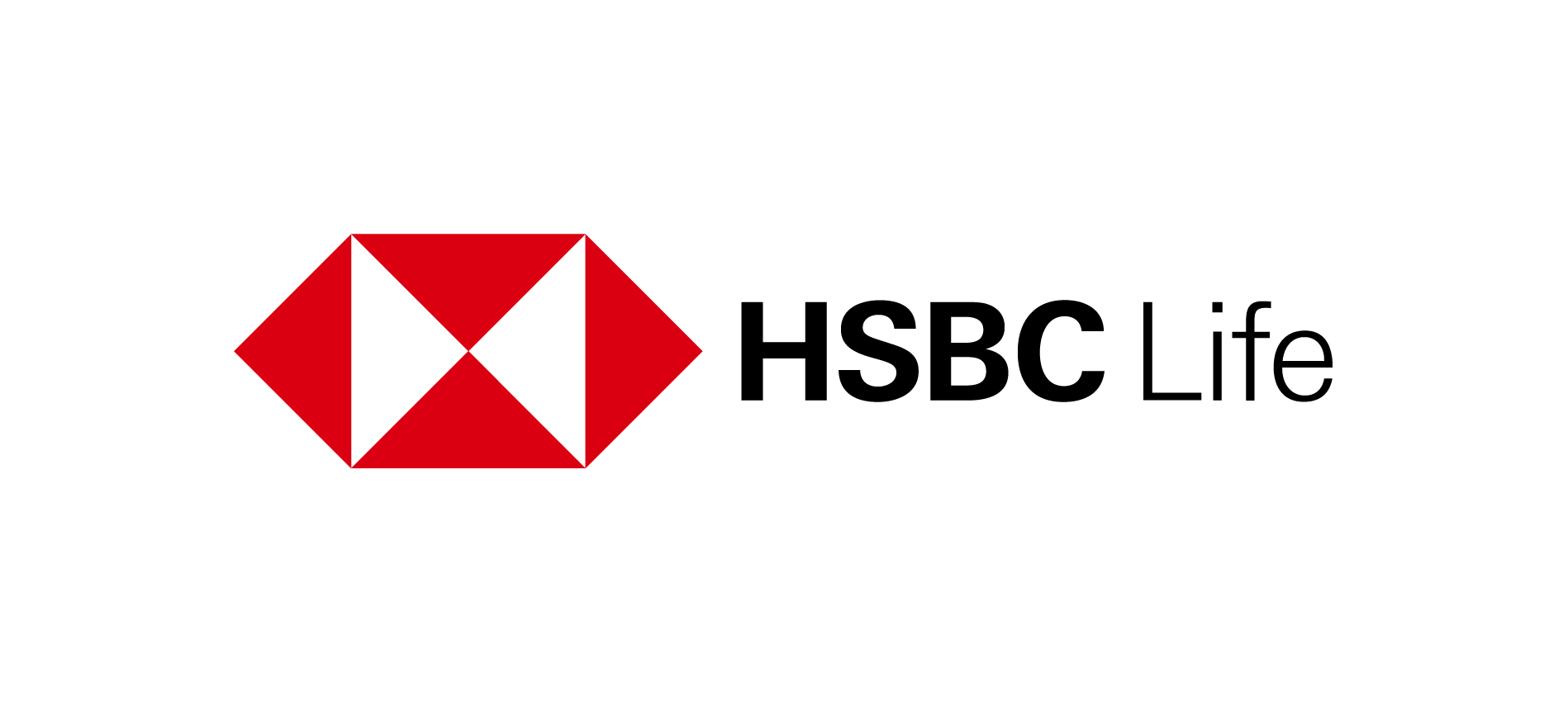
- Trade name: HSBC Life
- Type: Private
- Industry: Insurance & Financial Services
- Founded: September 8, 1976; 50 years ago
- Key people: Ed Moncreiffe (CEO)
- Products: Insurance
- Owner: The Hongkong and Shanghai Banking Corporation
- Subsidiaries: HSBC Life (International); HSBC Life Insurance; HSBC Life (Singapore)
- Website: life.hsbc.com

HSBC Life is the insurance business brand under HSBC Holdings, launched in 2018 as a new brand jointly adopted by all insurance entities under the HSBC Group. At present, the core entity of HSBC Life is HSBC Insurance (Asia-Pacific) Holdings Limited, which serves as the regional headquarters for the Group insurance business in Asia. It is a wholly owned subsidiary of The Hongkong and Shanghai Banking Corporation Limited (HSBC Hong Kong) and is ultimately controlled by the parent company, HSBC Group.

HSBC Insurance (Asia-Pacific) is headquartered at HSBC Centre in Tai Kok Tsui. Its principal operating subsidiaries (including those held directly or indirectly) include: HSBC Life (International), incorporated in Bermuda but operating in Hong Kong; HSBC Life (Singapore), incorporated in Singapore; and HSBC Life Insurance, incorporated in Shanghai, China.

Since 2022, HSBC Life has consistently ranked first in Hong Kong in terms of market share for new direct individual life business (life insurance), holding 21.53% of the market in the first quarter of 2025.

== History ==
The history of the HSBC Group involvement in the insurance business dates back to the 19th century, when it collaborated with Straits Insurance and Singapore Insurance in Singapore, maintaining an active presence in the Far East maritime trade market. However, HSBC formal entry into the insurance market as a group occurred in the 1970s. On 8 September 1976, HSBC and the Swire Group formed a joint venture, Wardley Swire Assurance, specializing in life insurance.

However, Wardley Swire Assurance was not HSBC initial entry into Hong Kong insurance market. The pivotal turning point for HSBC substantive involvement in the Hong Kong insurance market can be traced back to 12 April 1965, when it acquired a 51% stake in Hang Seng Bank. Notably, just three months prior to this acquisition, on 15 January 1965, Hang Seng Bank, together with three other major Chinese-owned banks in Hong Kong, jointly established Associated Bankers Insurance — the predecessor of Hang Seng Insurance — becoming the first general insurance company in Hong Kong specializing in bancassurance. Through its stake in Hang Seng Bank, HSBC indirectly entered Hong Kong insurance market for the first time.

HSBC's establishment of a "comprehensive insurance business" in Hong Kong can be traced back to the formation of Carlingford Insurance on February 25, 1977. Carlingford's predecessors were Malayan & China Assurance and Wardley Insurance—the name "Wardley" itself being traceable to HSBC’s origins at Wardley House in Hong Kong, as well as the investment banking subsidiary "Wardley" established in 1972.

=== Beginning ===
In 1970, through its subsidiary Hongkong Finance, HSBC entered into a partnership with Australia leading insurer, National Mutual Life Association. National Mutual acquired a 25% stake in HSBC Sydney-based associate, Mercantile Credits, reducing HSBC shareholding to 30%.

In 1971, HSBC entered the insurance market in New Zealand for the first time by acquiring a 29% stake in New Zealand Insurance and New Zealand Insurance Mortgage and Deposit, marking the Group first insurance investment in the country. In the same year, Mercantile Credits reported increased profits and paid dividends, while HSBC wholly owned subsidiary in Hong Kong, Hongkong Finance, also delivered satisfactory results.

In 1974, HSBC decided to incorporate insurance into its range of financial services, with the objective of providing insurance across the regions in which it operated globally. Prior to this, HSBC insurance interests primarily came from its associate, the associated companies of Hang Seng Bank ── Associated Bankers Insurance, and from Antony Gibbs & Sons in London, which operated as both an insurance broker and Lloyd underwriting agency.

In 1975, HSBC first directly controlled insurance joint venture ── Wardley Gibbs ── commenced operations in Hong Kong. HSBC held 67% of the company, with Antony Gibbs & Sons holding the remaining 33%. The company primarily acted as an insurance consultant and broker.

In 1976, HSBC and the Swire Group reached an agreement to jointly establish Wardley Swire Assurance, specializing in life insurance, through HSBC purchase of a 50% stake in Swire Life Assurance, which had been incorporated on 12 February 1974 by Swire. In the same year, HSBC subsidiary in Cyprus ── Labancor ── was appointed the exclusive local agent for Cornhill Insurance.

In 1977, HSBC acquired a 20% stake in the Malayan Group of Insurance Companies, headquartered in the Philippines. As part of the partnership, both parties established Wardley Insurance in Hong Kong, with HSBC holding 70%. The company commenced operations in January 1978, providing general insurance, reinsurance, and retirement benefits, while developing a business network in Hong Kong and international markets.

In 1979, Wardley Insurance achieved an underwriting profit of HK$448,707 in its second year of operations, reversing a loss of HK$1,117,027 in 1978. In the same year, Wardley Gibbs reported a 33% increase in expenses and brokerage income, while Wardley Swire managed assets grew from HK$397 million to approximately HK$545 million, representing a 37% increase. In addition, HSBC initiated the establishment of the EastPoint Reinsurance Company of Hong Kong and Al Sagr Insurance Company of Saudi Arabia.

=== 1980s ===
In 1981, in order to provide a clearer distinction between the Group different financial businesses, HSBC decided to rebrand its principal insurance companies from Wardley to Carlingford. During the year, Wardley Insurance underwriting profit rose sharply to HK$2.8 million, enabling its first dividend payment; Wardley Swire Assurance managed assets exceeding HK$1 billion. In the same year, HSBC also established Al Sagr Insurance Company UAE.

On 30 March 1981, HSBC insurance subsidiaries were officially renamed:

- Wardley Insurance became Carlingford Insurance.
- Wardley Swire Assurance became Carlingford Swire Assurance.
- Wardley Gibbs Insurance Consultants became Gibbs Insurance Consultants.

The move highlighted the growing importance of insurance within the Group, supported by advertising campaigns in television and newspapers.

In 1982, despite a global industry downturn, Carlingford Insurance underwriting profit grew to HK$6.5 million, and Carlingford Swire Assurance managed funds exceeded HK$1.8 billion. The latter also began offering savings-related schemes to individuals via its Bermuda subsidiary. HSBC insurance network now spanned the UK, Australia, Singapore, the Middle East, and Papua New Guinea, with new entities such as Carlingford Australia Insurance and Carlingford Insurance Brokers Singapore.

In 1983, Carlingford Insurance reported a pre-tax profit of HK$6.1 million. HSBC increased its stake in Carlingford Swire Assurance from 50% to 74.5%, with the company funds under management rising to HK$3.437 billion. In the UK, Gibbs Insurance Holdings acquired Hartley Cooper Holdings and merged its Lloyd Survey Agency business, which began operating as Gibbs Hartley Cooper from 1 January 1984. In Australia, Carlingford Australia announced its intention to acquire all the shares of Preservatrice Skandia Insurance, with the aim of achieving profitability soon after the merger.

In 1984, HSBC continued expanding its insurance operations, covering general insurance, life insurance, reinsurance, retirement benefits, consultancy, and brokerage services, across multiple countries. In Hong Kong, Carlingford Insurance, Citadel Insurance, and Gibbs Insurance Consultants continued to develop their businesses in a competitive market, while Carlingford Swire Assurance achieved steady progress in employee benefits and personal insurance. Overseas operations were also expanded, particularly in the UK, Australia, Singapore, and the Middle East, including through acquisitions and mergers aimed at enhancing scale and synergies in international insurance.

HSBC also advanced its international insurance cooperation. Carlingford Swire Assurance reached a special arrangement with the UK SunLife to help returning UK policyholders maintain investment and tax efficiency, as new legislation under consideration in the UK Parliament threatened to adversely affect the tax position of offshore life policies upon return. Carlingford Swire Assurance (Bermuda) was highly active in offshore life insurance, and for policyholders of its International Capital Plan, a bespoke solution was developed. After extensive negotiations, SunLife agreed to establish the SunLife Wardley Fund for Carlingford Swire Assurance policyholders. The fund was managed by SunLife, with investments overseen by HSBC Wardley Investment Services. Meanwhile, in Singapore, HSBC increased its stake in Gibbs Hartley Cooper Insurance Brokers and merged it with local brokerage operations, forming a more professional and independent insurance consultancy and brokerage platform. These measures reflected the Group long-term strategy of expanding insurance through strategic partnerships and investments in Asia and internationally.

In 1985, Carlingford Insurance and Gibbs Hartley Cooper Insurance Brokers continued business expansion, with contributions from associates such as the Citadel Group. The disposal of HSBC stake in EastPoint Reinsurance further rebalanced its portfolio. In Australia, the Carlingford Australia Insurance Group completed its first full year of operations under a challenging market environment. In the Middle East, brokerage activities expanded in the UAE and Oman, though local underwriting subsidiaries underperformed. In Singapore, Carlingford Insurance Brokers was reactivated, with integration and relocation costs leading to short-term losses, while international reinsurer RMCA recorded profit growth. In the UK, the disposal of Anton Underwriting Agencies was completed in line with the Lloyd Act 1982, Gibbs Hartley Cooper trading performance improved though it still recorded losses, while Hartley Cooper and Warner generated significant profits. In the same year, Carlingford Insurance also opened a branch in Macau.

In 1986, HSBC insurance operations in Hong Kong and the UK continued to expand, while Carlingford Australia Insurance Group decided to sell its Australian subsidiary due to operational difficulties. In Singapore, Carlingford Insurance Brokers expanded brokerage income. In the Middle East, Gibbs Gulf Insurance Consultants and RMCA Reinsurance expanded their businesses, while Al Sagr Insurance ceased underwriting due to regulatory and operational challenges.

In 1987, Carlingford Insurance entered the medical insurance sector by acquiring the Private Patients Plan (Hong Kong). Brokerage operations in Singapore continued to build both corporate and retail insurance business. Gibbs Gulf Insurance Consultants became a wholly owned subsidiary in the UAE, while Gibbs Hartley Cooper in the UK focused on developing profitable specialty insurance.

In 1988, HSBC further consolidated its insurance operations, renaming the medical insurance company acquired in 1987 as Carlingford Medical Insurance. Gibbs Insurance Consultants expanded into China, while markets in Singapore, the UAE, and the UK remained stable. In Asia, bank-led insurance distribution began to take shape.

In 1989, Carlingford Insurance and its subsidiary Carlingford Medical Insurance continued to expand in Hong Kong. Gibbs Insurance Consultants maintained stable operations in China, while the Citadel Group remained active in specialist underwriting. Gibbs Hartley Cooper in the UK developed its international wholesale and retail operations. Businesses in Singapore and the UAE were further consolidated.

=== 1990s ===
In 1991, HSBC Group UK insurance brokerage subsidiary Gibbs Hartley Cooper and Norwich Union Group jointly established a 50% owned joint venture, aiming to expand the UK household and motor insurance business. In the same year, Antony Gibbs Benefit Consultants acquired a pensions consultancy, and Gibbs Hartley Cooper acquired a retail insurance brokerage portfolio, driving intermediary insurance profits within the Group to a record high. In July, the Group established HongkongBank Insurance Services to strengthen insurance agency business for corporate and retail banking customers in the Asia-Pacific region.

In 1992, Gibbs Hartley Cooper acquired a UK commercial risk insurance portfolio, expanding its brokerage footprint; it also launched insurance agency operations in Australia and New Zealand to broaden regional coverage. In the same year, the Group implemented a strategic adjustment: divesting its 49% stake in a specialist reinsurance company in Bermuda and its wholly owned Lloyds Survey Agency in Chile, and terminating its insurance agency operations in Brunei (based on profitability considerations). At the end of the year, HSBC Insurance headquarters was relocated to London, and HSBC Insurance Holdings was established to coordinate global insurance activities and cost allocation, with plans to include — from 1993 onwards — the insurance business of Midland Bank, which became a member of HSBC Group in 1992, within its management scope; in 2021, due to Group business restructuring and internal resource integration arrangements, the company gradually ceased related activities from 2021 and no longer charged or allocated costs to other entities within the Group, and ceased operations on 24 June 2024.

In 1993, Gibbs Hartley Cooper acquired two small UK insurance brokerage firms, with integration expected to show results in 1994; its Singapore subsidiary Gibbs Insurance Brokers Singapore also acquired a peer institution, consolidating its regional market position.

In 1994, the Group signed an agreement to acquire Hong Kong-based Lombard Insurance, enhancing its market share in the highly competitive underwriting sector; it also acquired, for HKD 220 million, the Lombard Insurance stake held by Continental Insurance Corporation, strengthening its Hong Kong non-life business and expanding into the Singapore market; its Lloyds insurance brokerage subsidiary also purchased a six per cent stake in Hogg Group (later sold at a profit of GBP 4 million), although a full acquisition attempt was unsuccessful; In the same year, Carlingford Insurance and Carlingford Medical Insurance expanded their operations and launched InsureDirect in Hong Kong, a telephone-based direct motor insurance sales service.

In 1995, Midland Bank launched Midland Direct, a telephone-based household insurance brand; the Group also acquired motor insurer Corinthian from its Lloyds insurance brokerage subsidiary and merged it into HSBC Insurance (Ireland), a non-life underwriting operation formerly known as Griffin Insurance. In the same year, the Lloyds brokerage business, formerly Gibbs Hartley Cooper and then HSBC Gibbs, acquired Holmwoods, gaining a profitable school insurance brokerage portfolio.

Also in 1995, most of HSBC Group insurance entities adopted the HSBC brand, such as the major Asian company Carlingford Insurance, which was renamed HSBC Insurance; in October 2000 it was further renamed HSBC Insurance (Asia). By the end of 1995, Midland Bank acquired the remaining 20 per cent stake in Midland Life from major UK insurer Commercial Union, achieving full ownership.

In 1996, HSBC Gibbs sold Premium Credit and acquired Glasgow-based broker Hutchison & Craft; HSBC Gibbs also formed a joint venture with Midland Bank named Midland Business Insurance Direct to expand commercial insurance; in the same year, HSBC Insurance launched health insurance products in Hong Kong such as MediSurance.; On 25 April 1989, HSBC formally established HSBC Insurance (Asia-Pacific) to coordinate its insurance operations in the Asia-Pacific region. HSBC Insurance (Asia-Pacific) was formed by renaming T K M (FAR EAST) ── the world largest trade confirming house acquired by HSBC in October 1982 from the major London-based finance and investment group ── Tozer Kemsley & Milbourn (Holdings).

In 1997, HSBC Insurance formed strategic partnerships in the Asia-Pacific region with Royal & Sun Alliance (non-life) and American International Assurance (life) to extend services to previously uncovered markets; in the same year, HSBC USA predecessor, Marine Midland, acquired by HSBC Group in 1980, launched new life products to strengthen its regional market. Also in the same year, acquisitions in Brazil and Argentina significantly enhanced the Group non-life underwriting business, providing scale benefits, counter-cyclical income streams and improved reinsurance negotiating power.

In 1999, HSBC began distributing motor and other personal insurance products via the Internet, paving the way for future growth; to mark the 25th anniversary of HSBC Insurance, the head office relocated to HSBC Centre in Hong Kong.

=== 2000s ===
In 2003, HSBC Insurance (Asia-Pacific) announced the acquisition of 100 per cent of Keppel Insurance for approximately SGD 154 million; upon completion, the general insurance business of HSBC Insurance (Asia) Singapore Branch will be merged into Keppel Insurance and subsequently rebranded as HSBC Insurance (Singapore), marking HSBC first significant step toward expanding its market presence in Singapore insurance sector.

In 2006, HSBC obtained approval to operate Takaful in Malaysia. Reports indicated that HSBC Insurance (Asia-Pacific) partnered with Jerneh Asia Berhad and Malaysia Employees Provident Fund (EPF) to form the joint venture HSBC Amanah Takaful (Malaysia) Sdn Bhd, specialising in Islamic life insurance, with HSBC Insurance (Asia-Pacific) holding approximately 49 per cent; in March 2019, HSBC Insurance (Asia-Pacific) sold its 49 per cent stake in the Islamic business to FWD Insurance, which later became the largest shareholder.

In 2009, HSBC launched its life insurance operations in mainland China, HSBC Life Insurance Company Limited. An announcement in June revealed that HSBC Insurance (Asia-Pacific) wholly owned Hong Kong subsidiary HSBC Insurance (Asia) and Beijing National Trust each held 50 per cent in the newly established HSBC Life Insurance in Shanghai, with registered capital of RMB 500 million, commencing operations in the third quarter under CEPA arrangements. This represented a significant step in entering mainland China life insurance market.

=== 2010s ===
On 7 March 2012, as part of its strategic transformation, HSBC Group sold the general insurance operations of HSBC Insurance (Asia) and HSBC Insurance (Singapore) together with the Mexican operations (HSBC Seguros, S.A. de C.V., not owned by HSBC Insurance Asia-Pacific) to AXA Group. The deal included a ten-year exclusive bancassurance agreement granting AXA exclusive rights to distribute general insurance products through HSBC in Hong Kong (excluding Hang Seng Bank customers) and other Asian markets. AXA paid approximately US$494 million for the transaction; Prior to this sale, HSBC Insurance (Asia) had long been the largest general and property insurance company in Hong Kong. Upon completion of the transaction and the signing of a distribution agreement, AXA General Insurance Hong Kong assumed its market share, continuing to maintain its position as the largest general insurance company in Hong Kong.

On 9 July 2012, HSBC Europe (Netherlands) BV, a wholly owned subsidiary of HSBC Group, agreed to sell HSBC Reinsurance and HSBC Insurance (Ireland)—both of which had ceased underwriting and were in the process of winding down operations—to Catalina Holdings (Bermuda). The transaction involved assets of approximately US$273 million and was subject to approval by the Central Bank of Ireland, with completion expected in the third quarter of the same year.

On 26 October 2012, HSBC Life (International) announced the sale of its Taiwan Branch to Allianz Taiwan Life Insurance for US$18 million in cash. Under the agreement, the assets and liabilities of HSBC Life Taiwan Branch (excluding statutory deposits of approximately US$10 million) were to be transferred to Allianz Life. The transaction was subject to regulatory approval and was expected to be completed in the first half of the following year. At the time of the sale, HSBC Life Taiwan Branch had approximately 27,000 policies with total premiums of TWD 836 million, while Allianz Life total premiums amounted to approximately TWD 194.5 billion. As part of the arrangement, HSBC Bank and Allianz Singapore branch concurrently signed a 10-year exclusive bancassurance agreement covering Taiwan, Indonesia, Malaysia, China, Australia, Sri Lanka, Brunei, and the Philippines, whereby HSBC branches would have exclusive rights to distribute Allianz life insurance products. Allianz agreed to pay HSBC approximately US$100.5 million in cash for this distribution arrangement.

On 20 December 2012, HSBC Insurance (Asia-Pacific) signed an agreement with Sumitomo Life Insurance Company to sell its entire 18 per cent stake in Vietnam insurer Bao Viet for approximately US$340 million.

On 29 April 2013, HSBC Insurance (Asia-Pacific) sold its 50 per cent minus one shareholding in Hana HSBC Life Insurance to Hana Financial Group Inc., as part of the Group business streamlining strategy.

=== 2020s - present ===
On 26 July 2021, HSBC moved to re-enter the Macau life insurance market. Previously, due to Group strategy, HSBC in Macau had ceased accepting new policies, effectively putting its life insurance licence into “dormant” status.

On 16 August 2021, HSBC Insurance (Asia-Pacific) announced the acquisition of 100 per cent of AXA Insurance Pte Ltd in Singapore for US$575 million to expand its Singapore insurance and wealth management operations; AXA Singapore was the eighth-largest life insurer and fifth-largest general insurer in the market. The transaction completed in February 2022 with a final consideration of approximately US$529 million, with plans to merge AXA Singapore with HSBC existing Singapore insurance operations.

On 14 December 2021, HSBC Group, through its wholly owned subsidiary Arcadia Financial Services (Asia), registered in both Hong Kong and mainland China, completed the full acquisition of Beijing Fanghe Wanjin Insurance Brokers. The company was renamed HSBC Insurance Brokerage on 16 June 2022. On 11 November the same year, its parent company Arcadia Financial Services (Asia) was renamed HSBC Insurance Brokers Greater China, marking the Group formal entry into mainland China insurance brokerage market.

On 30 December 2021, following regulatory changes in China effective 1 January 2020, including the revised Regulations on the Administration of Foreign-funded Insurance Companies and the Notice on Removing the Foreign Ownership Cap in Insurance Companies, HSBC Insurance (Asia), a wholly owned Hong Kong subsidiary of HSBC Insurance (Asia-Pacific), received approval from the Shanghai office of the China Banking and Insurance Regulatory Commission to acquire the remaining 50 per cent stake in HSBC Life Insurance (HSBC Life China) from partner National Trust, making it a wholly owned subsidiary.

On 1 February 2023, under section 119(1)(a) of the Insurance Act 1966 and pursuant to the transfer scheme approved by the Monetary Authority of Singapore on 4 November 2022 and the High Court of Singapore on 17 January 2023, all operations of HSBC Insurance (Singapore) and AXA Singapore were formally merged and transferred to the newly established HSBC Life (Singapore), with the transaction consideration equivalent to the total assets and liabilities as valued under MAS regulatory reporting standards on 1 February 2023.

On 29 February 2024, HSBC Insurance announced that a US$250 million (approximately HKD 2 billion) life policy issued in Hong Kong earlier in the year had been recognised by Guinness World Records on 20 February as the world highest-value life insurance policy.

On 20 December 2024, HSBC Continental Europe signed a memorandum of understanding to sell its French life insurance business HSBC Assurances Vie (France) to French mutual insurance group Matmut, with completion expected in the second half of 2025.

On 2 February 2025, HSBC received regulatory approval to set up a captive insurance company in Hong Kong named Wayfoong (Asia), to consolidate and diversify insurable risks and provide reinsurance for HSBC relevant risks in the Asian market — the name “Wayfoong” is the Cantonese romanisation of HSBC and has been used multiple times in the Group history, such as the Wayfoong Gold service launched in 1981.

On 3 July 2025, HSBC Bank in the UK announced it had signed an agreement to sell its UK life insurance business HSBC Life (UK) to UK life and pensions company Chesnara, with completion expected in early 2026.

In September 2025, HSBC Life issued a US$400 million life insurance policy in Singapore, surpassing the previous record of US$250 million it set in Hong Kong in 2024. This followed a period of significant activity for the insurer; three months prior to the Singapore issuance, the company had issued five policies across Singapore, Hong Kong, and mainland China with a total combined value of US$420 million.

In early 2026, HSBC initiated a strategic review and subsequent sale process for its Singapore life insurance unit, HSBC Life (Singapore), advised by JPMorgan. Reports indicated a targeted valuation exceeding US$1 billion. By April 2026, sources revealed a shortlist of bidders including Allianz SE, Dai-ichi Life Group, and Sumitomo Life Insurance. By June 2026, Allianz SE emerged as the leading contender to acquire the business in a deal potentially valued at up to US$2 billion.

== Operations ==
HSBC Insurance business model differs from traditional insurance companies, with its sales channels primarily relying on HSBC Bank network (bancassurance), especially in Hong Kong, where customers must be retail banking users of HSBC Hong Kong. This strategy closely links its insurance business with banking operations, and performance is often influenced by the group market trends in the retail banking sector. If the group adjusts or scales down its retail operations in a certain region, the insurance business may also be adjusted accordingly.

=== Asia ===
HSBC Insurance business in Asia is coordinated by HSBC Insurance (Asia-Pacific) Holdings Limited, whose direct subsidiaries include HSBC Insurance (Asia) and HSBC Life (Singapore). Additionally, in 2007 HSBC partnered with Canara Bank and Oriental Bank of Commerce to establish the joint venture Canara HSBC Life Insurance in India, with HSBC holding approximately 26% equity.

In 2021, under the "Pivot to Asia" strategic guidance, the group readjusted resource allocation as part of responding to slowed growth and profit pressures in European and American markets. The strategy aims to redeploy capital and resources to Asia, which contributes most of the group profits. According to the strategy report announced in February that year, HSBC plans to invest about US$6 billion in Asia to drive growth in wealth management and personal banking, with insurance business as a key component of this sector.

A landmark event in advancing this strategy was the acquisition of AXA Singapore for US$575 million, alongside increased investment in the mainland China market. These initiatives further strengthened HSBC momentum in Asian insurance business development, especially through active expansion and product innovation in the Hong Kong and Macau markets.

==== Hong Kong and Macau ====
HSBC Insurance initially operated general insurance in Hong Kong and Macau via HSBC Insurance (Asia), formerly Carlingford Insurance. After selling the general insurance business to AXA Group in 2012, its focus shifted to life insurance, continuing operations in the Hong Kong market through a Bermuda-registered subsidiary. Currently, HSBC Insurance (Asia) primarily manages insurance legal entities in the Greater China region, directly holding all local subsidiaries.

In Hong Kong and Macau, HSBC Life (International) is the principal underwriting company, tracing back to a Carlingford Insurance member, Carlingford Swire Assurance (Bermuda), established in 1981 and renamed to its current name in 1992. Leveraging HSBC Bank sales network, the company holds a leading position in the Hong Kong life insurance market. According to the Insurance Authority of Hong Kong, by new business premium, HSBC Insurance has ranked first in Hong Kong for multiple consecutive years since 2022. In the first half of 2022, its market share in new business reached 23.6%. It maintained the lead subsequently, with a 18.9% market share for new business in 2023, and recorded over HKD 20 billion new business premium in Q1 2025, expanding its market share to 21.5%, demonstrating stable market performance and competitiveness.

In Macau, HSBC Life (International) conducts business through its Macau branch and is regulated by the Monetary Authority of Macau. After a relatively quiet decade in Macau, HSBC restarted and vigorously developed its Macau insurance business from 2021. To support business expansion, HSBC opened its first standalone "HSBC Insurance Planning Centre" in Macau commercial centre in August 2023, serving local and Greater Bay Area clients. This development is seen as a significant step in strengthening the group Greater Bay Area business layout.

===== Other businesses and partners =====
HSBC Life (International) maintains close cooperation with the Mandatory Provident Fund (a Hong Kong mandatory provident fund scheme) schemes sponsored by HSBC Bank and Hang Seng Bank. The guaranteed funds under HSBC Mandatory Provident Fund – SuperTrust Plus and Hang Seng Mandatory Provident Fund – SuperTrust Plus are approved pooled investment funds constituted by insurance policies, provided by HSBC Life (International).

Additionally, on 1 November 2024, HSBC Life (International) established a new medical insurance partnership with Hang Seng Bank, collaborating to design and sell Voluntary Health Insurance Scheme (VHIS) products through Hang Seng Bank, further expanding cooperation in health insurance.

==== Mainland China ====
In Mainland China, HSBC Insurance primarily offers various insurance products, including life, health, and accident insurance, through its wholly owned subsidiary HSBC Life Insurance under HSBC Insurance (Asia). The company has registered capital of RMB 2.676 billion, headquartered in Shanghai Free Trade Zone. Its service regions currently include Beijing, Shanghai, Tianjin, Guangdong (including Shenzhen), Zhejiang, Sichuan, and Jiangsu, subject to territorial business permits.

To advance the "Greater Wealth Management" strategy, HSBC officially launched HSBC Insurance Brokerage in June 2022, headquartered in Beijing with branches in multiple locations. The company focuses on providing integrated insurance and wealth solutions to individual and corporate clients, collaborating synergistically with HSBC Life Insurance to expand market share in key regions such as the Yangtze River Delta.

A major milestone in business development was HSBC Insurance Brokerage announcement in September 2023 that its securities investment fund sales qualification was officially approved by the Beijing Regulatory Bureau of the China Securities Regulatory Commission (CSRC). This made HSBC Insurance Brokerage the first wealth management institution in mainland China holding dual licenses for insurance brokerage and fund sales. The qualification supports promoting an integrated "insurance + funds" wealth management model, enhancing service diversity and flexibility. In early August 2025, HSBC continued to strengthen capital injection into HSBC Insurance Brokerage, increasing its registered capital from approximately RMB 2.23 billion to about RMB 2.52 billion.

In 2024, HSBC Insurance in mainland China recorded a net profit of RMB 195 million, ending years of losses. This was mainly due to a series of capital injections and transformation measures initiated after the group completed full ownership of HSBC Life Insurance in 2021. From 2022 to 2025, the group implemented three consecutive capital increase plans: RMB 635 million injected in June 2022, RMB 654 million in March 2023, and RMB 362 million in February 2025, cumulatively totaling RMB 1.651 billion, raising registered capital to RMB 2.676 billion. Capital injection drove rapid business scale expansion, with premium income rising from RMB 3.725 billion in 2022 to RMB 13.089 billion in 2024, more than tripling. Meanwhile, the company promoted sales channel diversification, reducing bancassurance dependence to 65.97%, and through product structure optimization achieved a shift from investment period to profitability period, with a core solvency ratio improving to 193.02% in 2024, further strengthening financial soundness.

==== Singapore ====
In Singapore, HSBC Insurance mainly provides services through HSBC Life (Singapore). Before merging AXA Singapore, HSBC Insurance (Singapore) business focused primarily on savings and wealth accumulation products, while AXA had strong competitiveness in health insurance.

After completing acquisition and integration of AXA Singapore, HSBC Life Insurance market position in Singapore improved. According to information published at the time of acquisition, the merged company is expected to become the seventh largest life insurer and the fourth largest personal health insurance provider in Singapore by annualized new premiums. This integration helped expand HSBC local market scale and diversify its distribution channels, covering bancassurance, insurance agent networks, and independent financial advisor firms (FAs).

HSBC strategy in Singapore focuses on leveraging its "bank + insurance" synergy to provide integrated solutions covering wealth protection, accumulation, and inheritance. Besides servicing the local market, HSBC also actively expands high-net-worth client business leveraging its Asian regional brand influence, particularly valuing Singapore status as a major wealth management hub in Asia and globally.

==== India ====
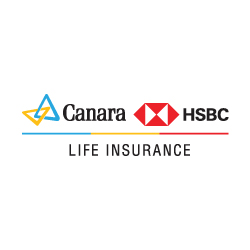
Company logo of Canara HSBC Life Insurance

HSBC Insurance participates in the Indian life insurance market through its 26% equity stake in the joint venture Canara HSBC Life Insurance. In this joint venture structure, HSBC serves not only as a capital and brand partner but also leverages its global insurance expertise to assist in technology support, risk management, and product design. Canara HSBC Life Insurance mainly sells life insurance products via bancassurance through the extensive branch networks of its banking partners nationwide, covering a broad customer base.

In April 2025, Canara HSBC Life Insurance submitted a draft red herring prospectus (DRHP) for its initial public offering (IPO) to the Securities and Exchange Board of India (SEBI) and obtained approval from the Insurance Regulatory and Development Authority of India (IRDAI) in July the same year. The market generally expects the company to list between September and October 2025. The IPO will be an Offer for Sale (OFS), meaning no new shares will be issued; instead, existing shareholders will sell part of their holdings. The three major shareholders—Canara Bank, Punjab National Bank, and HSBC Insurance (Asia-Pacific)—plan to participate in this share sale. Although shareholding ratios post-listing are not finalized, the public offering will enhance transparency and liquidity and unlock partial investment value for existing shareholders.

==== Comparison of asian markets ====
Performance comparison table of HSBC Insurance major markets (2022–2025)
Notes： a）All figures are presented in millions of Hong Kong dollars for comparison purposes. b）Premiums received reflect only direct underwriting and exclude inward or outward reinsurance. Premiums received are a cash-based concept, referring solely to the premiums actually collected within a given period. c）In response to the adoption of International Financial Reporting Standard 17 "Insurance Contracts" (IFRS 17) in 2023, certain 2022 figures have been restated accordingly. d）“Insurance revenue” and “premiums written” are two distinct accounting concepts. With the adoption of IFRS 17, “insurance revenue” has replaced the traditional “premiums written” as the core income indicator in insurers’ financial statements. The key difference is that insurance revenue excludes the deposit component of premiums and is recognized over the period during which insurance services are provided, whereas premiums written represents the total amount of premiums contractually committed through policies or endorsements issued during a given period, regardless of whether the premiums have been collected. The former reflects the accounting treatment of revenue recognition, while the latter provides a more intuitive measure of an insurer market size and market share. e）The data reflects only the business performance of HSBC Life (International) and does not represent the overall operations of HSBC Holdings in the Hong Kong and Macau markets, nor does it include market data for Hang Seng Insurance.
| Item | Hong Kong and Macau^{e} | | Mainland China | | Singapore | |
| Item | Related | Change | Related | Change | Related | Change |
2025年
| Premiums written^{d} | 88,577 | 48.21% | 15,137 (~CN¥13,605m) | 3.94% | 13,241 (~SG$2,186m) | 23.60% |
| Premiums written^{d} | Macau: 284 (~MOP$292) | 41.43% | 15,137 (~CN¥13,605m) | 3.94% | 13,241 (~SG$2,186m) | 23.60% |
| Premiums received^{b} | 89,052 | 52.25% | 15,066 (~CN¥13,541m) | 4.12% | 12,586 (~SG$2,088m) | 19.59% |
| Insurance revenue^{d} | 12,845 | 26.69% | - | - | 4,089 (~SG$678m) | 26.63% |
| Net profit | 7,289 | 24.15% | 201 (~CN¥180m) | -7.51% | 706 (~SG$117m) | 1,430.73% |
| Net profit | Macau: -23 (~MOP$-23) | 19.19% | 201 (~CN¥180m) | -7.51% | 706 (~SG$117m) | 1,430.73% |
| Total asset | 647,974 | 13.78% | 61,288 (~CN¥55,085m) | 30.70% | 81,085 (~SG$13,385m) | 9.45% |
| Total asset | Macau: 1,571 (~MOP$1,615) | 9.57% | 61,288 (~CN¥55,085m) | 30.70% | 81,085 (~SG$13,385m) | 9.45% |
2024
| Premiums written^{d} | 59,763 | 10.24% | 13,932 (~CN¥13,089m) | 79.05% | 10,095 (~SG$1,768m) | 24.39% |
| Premiums written^{d} | Macau: 201 (~MOP$207) | 77.02% | 13,932 (~CN¥13,089m) | 79.05% | 10,095 (~SG$1,768m) | 24.39% |
| Premiums received^{b} | 58,489 | 8.85% | 13,842 (~CN¥13,005m) | 79.34% | 9,922 (~SG$1,745m) | 24.44% |
| Insurance revenue^{d} | 10,139 | 23.06% | - | - | 3,045 (~SG$536m) | -11.93% |
| Net profit | 5,871 | 21.25% | 208 (~CN¥195m) | 329.49% | 43 (~SG$8m) | 151.51% |
| Net profit | Macau: -28 (~MOP$-29) | 0.43% | 208 (~CN¥195m) | 329.49% | 43 (~SG$8m) | 151.51% |
| Total asset | 569,481 | 4.09% | 44,862 (~CN¥42,147m) | 57.33% | 69,526 (~SG$12,230m) | 4.71% |
| Total asset | Macau: 1,429 (~MOP$1,474) | 10.68% | 44,862 (~CN¥42,147m) | 57.33% | 69,526 (~SG$12,230m) | 4.71% |
2023
| Premiums written^{d} | 54,030 | -1.75% | 8,065 (~CN¥7,311m) | 96.25% | 8,408 (~SG$1,422m) | 41.21% |
| Premiums written^{d} | Macau: 113 (~MOP$117) | 169.31% | 8,065 (~CN¥7,311m) | 96.25% | 8,408 (~SG$1,422m) | 41.21% |
| Premiums received^{b} | 53,732 | -1.79% | 7,984 (~CN¥7,252m) | 80.15% | 8,303 (~SG$1,402m) | 43.37% |
| Insurance revenue^{d} | 8,239 | 26.73% | - | - | 3,578 (~SG$608m) | 2.53% |
| Net profit | 4,842 | 53.76% | -94 (~CN¥-85m) | 84.27% | -87 (~SG$-15m) | 78.94% |
| Net profit | Macau: -28 (~MOP$-29) | -196.05% | -94 (~CN¥-85m) | 84.27% | -87 (~SG$-15m) | 78.94% |
| Total asset | 547,126 | 8.48% | 29,626 (~CN¥26,780m) | 35.88% | 68,718 (~SG$11,679m) | 146.52% |
| Total asset | Macau: 1,293 (~MOP$1,331) | 4.5% | 29,626 (~CN¥26,780m) | 35.88% | 68,718 (~SG$11,679m) | 146.52% |
2022^{c}
| Premiums written^{d} | 54,992 | 31.97% | 4,215 (~CN¥3,725m) | 52.31% | 5,861 (~SG$1,007m) | -18.85% |
| Premiums written^{d} | Macau: 42 (~MOP$43) | 69.55% | 4,215 (~CN¥3,725m) | 52.31% | 5,861 (~SG$1,007m) | -18.85% |
| Premiums received^{b} | 54,712 | - | 4,559 (~CN¥4,025m) | 6.67% | 5,703 (~SG$978m) | - |
| Insurance revenue^{d} | 6,501 | - | - | - | 3,445 (~SG$594m) | - |
| Net profit | 3,050 | - | -604 (~CN¥-540m) | -140.03% | -407 (~SG$-70m) | - |
| Net profit | Macau: 29 (~MOP$30) | 2,204.43% | -604 (~CN¥-540m) | -140.03% | -407 (~SG$-70m) | - |
| Total asset | 504,370 | -6.58% | 22,007 (~CN¥19,709m) | 17.87% | 27,448 (~SG$4,736m) | -13.54% |
| Total asset | Macau: 1,237 (~MOP$1,274) | 4.05% | 22,007 (~CN¥19,709m) | 17.87% | 27,448 (~SG$4,736m) | -13.54% |

=== Other markets ===
Apart from the Asian market, HSBC Insurance also operates insurance businesses in the United Kingdom, France, and Malta, but these businesses have been gradually announced for sale. In contrast, HSBC continues to maintain insurance operations in Mexico and the United States; however, their market scale is relatively limited and far less significant compared to the Group business scale and importance in Asia.

== See also ==
- List of insurance companies in Hong Kong
