= IndusInd Securities =

Indian equity broker

IndusInd Securities Limited
- Formerly: Reliance Securities Limited (2005 - 2025)
- Type: Private
- Founded: 17 June 2005
- Headquarters: Reliance Centre, Santa Cruz (East), Mumbai, India
- Area served: India
- Key people: Lav Chaturvedi; Chief Executive Officer
- Products: Equity Broking
- Owner: hinduja Group
- Number of employees: 900
- Parent: IndusInd Capital
- Website: indusindmoney.com

IndusInd Securities Limited formerly Reliance Securities Limited is a broking arm of Reliance Capital. It is one of India’s largest retail broking houses with over 1 million customers and a pan-India presence at more than 1,700 locations. The company is a corporate member of both the Bombay Stock Exchange (BSE) and the National Stock Exchange (NSE), and provides access to equities, derivatives, IPO's, mutual funds, bonds and corporate FDs.

== See also ==
- List of private equity firms
