= Liberty General Insurance =

Indian Insurance Company Pvt Ltd

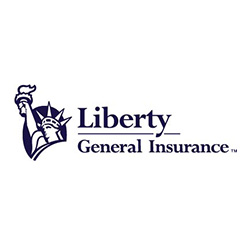
- Industry: Insurance
- Founded: 2013
- Headquarters: Mumbai, India
- Area served: India
- Key people: Parag Ved - CEO and Whole Time Director
- Products: Motor, Health, Travel, Property, Commercial & Industrial Insurance
- Number of employees: 1200
- Parent: Liberty Mutual (48.7%), DP Jindal Group (26%) & ENAM Securities (25.32%)
- Website: https://www.libertyinsurance.in

Liberty General Insurance Limited is a private general insurance company headquartered in Mumbai, India. It is a joint venture among US property casualty insurer Liberty Mutual Insurance Group, Indian private investment fund Enam Securities, and Indian industrial conglomerate DP Jindal Group.

== History and ownership ==
Liberty General Insurance was started in 2013 as Liberty Videocon General Insurance, a joint venture between Liberty Mutual and Videocon Group. In March 2018, Videocon sold its 51.3% stake in the venture to a combination of DP Jindal (26%) and Enam Securities (25.3%), and the company was renamed Liberty General Insurance Limited.

== Business operations and financials ==
As in March 2018, Liberty General Insurance had a market share of 0.54%, with a growth rate of 40% in 2017. The company has approximately 1,200 employees spread across 23 states.

Liberty General Insurance has also entered into collaboration with over 30 district cooperative banks as "affinity partners" to help them issue vehicle and personal accident insurance, particularly to farmers. Liberty General Insurance Limited sells its insurance products through its branches, its website as well as through online aggregators. It has also signed a tie-up agreement with UCO Bank to boost growth with the "Bancassurance" model. Under this model, the promoter bank will distribute the insurance products offered by Liberty General Insurance at its branches through its existing customer base. Its partner network consists of about 5,000 hospitals and more than 3,100 auto service centres.

Liberty General Insurance began its operations with an initial investment of Rs. 350 crore. As of March 2018, the paid up capital of the company stood at Rs. 1084 crores.

Liberty General Insurance, one of the leading non-life insurance company in India, has been appointed as the lead insurer for Delhi by the Insurance Regulatory and Development Authority of India.
