= Chesnara =

British life assurance company

- Type: Public
- Traded as: LSE: CSN
- Industry: Life assurance and pensions
- Founded: 2004
- Headquarters: Preston, Lancashire, United Kingdom
- Key people: Luke Savage (Chairman); Steve Murray (CEO)
- Revenue: ▲£186.3 million (2025)
- Operating income: ▼£30.2 million (2025)
- Net income: ▼£(10.4) million (2025)
- Website: www.chesnara.co.uk

Chesnara plc is a life assurance and pensions business, based in Preston, Lancashire, United Kingdom. It is listed on the London Stock Exchange and is a constituent of the FTSE 250 Index.

== History ==
The company was established when the life assurance business of Countrywide was demerged in May 2004. Graham Kettleborough was appointed chief executive at that time and went on to lead the company through the acquisition of a series of other portfolios and businesses. These included City of Westminster Assurance for £70 million in January 2007 and the pensions provider, Save & Prosper Group, for £63.5 million in November 2010.

Following the resignation of Kettleborough in December 2014, John Deane was appointed chief executive. The company acquired the Dutch insurance business of Legal & General for £137 million in April 2017.

After Deane stepped down in May 2021, Steve Murray became chief executive. In November 2021, the company bought Robein Leven, a provider of savings accounts, mortgages and annuities, operating in the Netherlands.

The company acquired the UK bonds and legacy pensions business of Canada Life in December 2024. Then, in July 2025, the company announced that it had signed an agreement to acquire the UK life assurance business of HSBC Life for £260 million, with completion expected in early 2026. In January 2026, it was announced that Chesnara had completed the acquisition of HSBC Life.
