= Ageas Federal Life Insurance =

Indian Life Insurance Company Pvt Ltd

- Type: Joint-venture subsidiary
- Industry: Financial services
- Founded: 2008; 18 years ago
- Headquarters: Mumbai, India
- Area served: India
- Key people: Jude Gomes (CEO)
- Products: Life insurance
- Owner: Ageas and Federal Bank
- Website: www.ageasfederal.com

Ageas Federal Life Insurance is an Indian life insurance company. It started operations in 2008 as IDBI Federal Life Insurance, and renamed as Ageas Federal Life Insurance in 2020.

The company operates as a joint venture between Ageas, a Belgium-based multinational insurance group, and The Federal Bank, an Indian private sector bank, with IDBI Bank continuing as a distribution partner. It is regulated by the Insurance Regulatory and Development Authority of India (IRDAI).

== History ==
Ageas Federal Life Insurance began operations in 2008, with distribution largely driven by bancassurance partnerships with its partner banks~~.~~ Over time, it expanded its distribution network to include agency, broker, and direct channels. The company was originally promoted by IDBI Bank, The Federal Bank and Ageas.

Following a restructuring in 2020, Ageas increased its stake to 49%, while IDBI Bank and The Federal Bank held 25% and 26%, respectively. In 2022, Ageas acquired IDBI Bank's 25% stake for approximately ₹580 crore, increasing its ownership to 74%, while The Federal Bank held 26%. IDBI Bank subsequently transitioned to a distribution partner role.

In 2025, The Federal Bank agreed to acquire an additional 4% stake in the company for approximately ₹97 crore, which would increase its shareholding to 30%, subject to regulatory approvals.

== Operations ==
The company is led by Chief Executive Officer Jude Gomes. Ageas Federal follows a multi-channel distribution model, anchored in bancassurance partnerships with The Federal Bank and IDBI Bank. The company has also expanded its reach through B2B2C partnerships with institutions such as Unity Small Finance Bank, Vakrangee, and digital platforms associated with Jio.

As of March 2025, the company operated through a network of over 3,770 branches, largely leveraging the branch infrastructure of its partner banks. In May 2026, Ageas Federal entered into a digital distribution partnership with the insurance aggregator Policybazaar, enabling direct online access to its product portfolio.

Ageas Federal Life Insurance provides various life insurance products, including term, savings, retirement, and group insurance policies, which are distributed primarily through its bancassurance and agency networks.

== See also ==
- Life Insurance Corporation of India
- HDFC Life
- ICICI Prudential Life Insurance
