= Royal Sundaram General Insurance =

Indian insurance company pvt ltd

Royal Sundaram General Insurance Co. Limited
- Type: Private
- Industry: Financial services
- Founded: 2000
- Headquarters: Chennai, Tamil Nadu, India
- Key people: Mr S Viji, Chairman
- Products: General insurance; Vehicle insurance; Health insurance; Home insurance; Travel insurance; Accident insurance; Marine insurance
- Number of employees: 2,000
- Parent: Sundaram Finance (50%); Ageas (40%)
- Website: www.royalsundaram.in

Royal Sundaram General Insurance Co. Ltd. (formerly known as Royal Sundaram Alliance Insurance Company Limited) is an Indian private sector general insurance company, part of the Sundaram Finance Group. It was licensed in October 2000 by the Insurance Regulatory and Development Authority of India.

The company was initially promoted as a joint venture between Sundaram Finance, an Indian non-banking financial institution, and Royal & SunAlliance Insurance, a general insurer in the UK. In July 2015, Sundaram Finance acquired the 26% equity holding from Royal & SunAlliance Insurance. Consequently, Sundaram Finance owned 75.90% of the shareholding and other Indian shareholders held the remaining 24.10%.

== See also ==
- List of insurance companies in India
- Insurance in India
- Oppenheimer Holdings
