= Aegon =

Dutch financial services company

Aegon Ltd.
- Aegon logo for use outside of The Netherlands since 2024

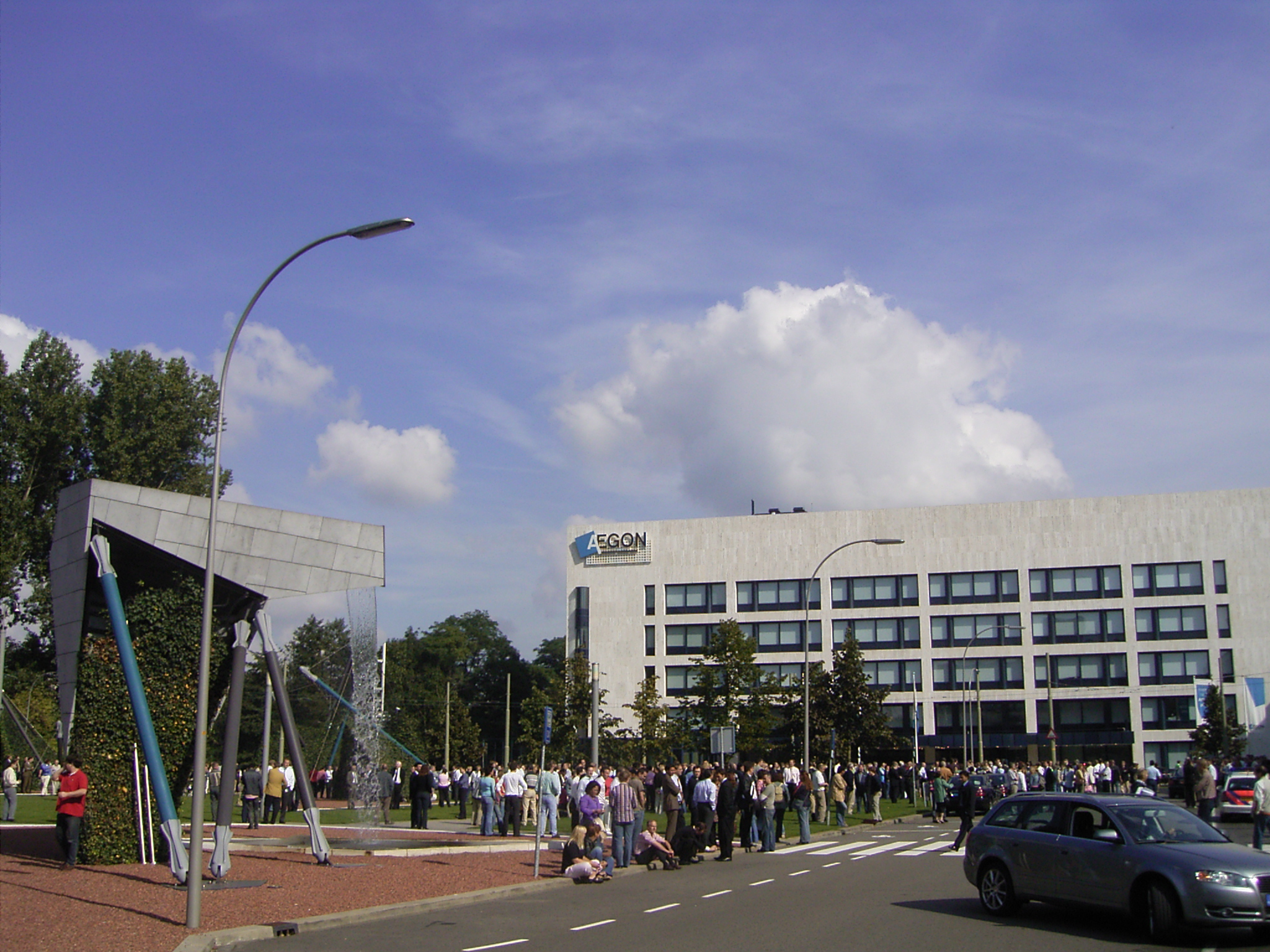
- Former headquarters in The Hague, Netherlands
- Type: Public
- Traded as: Euronext Amsterdam: AGN; AEX component
- ISIN: BMG0112X1056
- Industry: Financial services
- Predecessor: ENNIA
- Founded: 1844; 182 years ago
- Headquarters: Haarlemmermeer (Schiphol), Netherlands
- Area served: Worldwide
- Key people: Lard Friese (CEO)
- Services: Life insurance, asset management, pensions
- Revenue: ▲€25,657 million (2020)
- Operating income: ▲€28,197 million (2020)
- Net income: ▼€55 million (2020)
- AUM: ▲€293 billion (2022)
- Total assets: ▲€444,868 million (2020)
- Total equity: ▲€444,868 million (2020)
- Members: 30.4 million (2021)
- Number of employees: 22,400 (2021)
- Subsidiaries: Aegon Bank N.V.; Aegon Capital B.V.; Aegon Hypotheken B.V.; Aegon Levensverzekering N.V.; Aegon Schadeverzekering N.V.; Aegon Spaarkas N.V.; Nedasco B.V.; Robidus Groep B.V.; TKP Pensioen B.V; Transamerica Corporation; ASR Nederland (29.99%)
- Website: www.aegon.com

Aegon Ltd. is a Dutch public company for life insurance, pensions and asset management. It is headquartered in the Netherlands, and has 15,000 employees in 2026. Aegon is listed on the Euronext Amsterdam and is a constituent of the AEX index. It also operated a direct bank under the brand name "Knab" in the Netherlands. In October 2022, it was announced that AEGON's Dutch operations would be acquired by ASR Nederland (29.99% of which is owned by AEGON). To the extent they had the AEGON trade name, it will become ASR; Knab and TKP will keep their names. Subsequently, AEGON reincorporated in Bermuda.

== History ==
Logo used until 2023, still used for Aegon-branded services in the Netherlands

Aegon was founded in 1983 from the merger of AGO Holding N.V. (created by the merger of Algemeene Friesche, Groot-Noordhollandsche and Olveh (Onderlinge Verzekeringsmaatschappij Eigen Hulp) in 1968) and Ennia N.V. (formed by the merger of Eerste Nederlandsche and Nillmij (Nederlandsch-Indische Levensverzekering- en Lijfrente-Maatschappij) in 1969).

Aegon acquired Scottish Equitable in 1994. In 1998, it formed Stonebridge International Insurance Ltd to create and market a range of personal insurance products, providing accident, health and unemployment cover to its own customers and via business partners.

In 1999, it acquired the life assurance business of Guardian Royal Exchange. That year it also bought Transamerica Corporation.

On August 13, 2007, Aegon and Merrill Lynch announced a strategic business partnership in the areas of life insurance and investment products. As part of the relationship, Aegon acquired two of Merrill Lynch's life insurance companies for US$1.3 billion.

On April 23, 2008, Alex Wynaendts succeeded the retiring Donald J. Shepard as chairman of the executive board and CEO of Aegon N.V. following the group's annual general meeting of shareholders: Donald Shepard announced his retirement in November 2007, after six years as chairman.

On October 28, 2008, the Dutch government and De Nederlandsche Bank agreed to give Aegon a €3 billion capital injection to create a capital buffer in exchange for convertible bonds due to the effects of the 2008 financial crisis. On June 15, 2011, Aegon fulfilled its key objective of repurchasing all of the €3 billion core capital securities issued to the Dutch state. The total amount Aegon has paid to the Dutch state amounts to €4.1 billion. Of this amount, €3 billion covered the original issue of core capital securities, while an additional €1.1 billion was paid in premium and interest.

On August 3, 2011, Aegon USA announced that all its various businesses will be grouped under a single brand name: Transamerica. Transamerica's key businesses are life insurance, investments and retirement. The group includes companies whose history goes back over 100 years and whose products and services have become well known throughout the US, including founding companies Life Investors Insurance Company of America and Monumental Life Insurance Company.

In June 2018, AEGON was criticized by Greenpeace for its investments in oil sand companies and pipelines. Aegon reacted by stating that it was developing a new policy with regards to the oil and gas sector. In 2019, they decided to discontinue their oil sand investments.

On May 15, 2020, Lard Friese (former CEO of NN Group) succeeded Alex Wynaendts as the CEO of Aegon N.V..

In April 2026, Aegon agreed to sell their UK business to Standard Life in a deal worth £2 billion to shift their focus towards the US market. Standard Life will pay £750 million in cash as well as issuing shares, giving Aegon a 15.3% stake in the group.

== Operations ==
Aegon's businesses focus on life insurance and pensions, savings and asset management products. The group is also active in accident and supplemental health insurance and general insurance, and has limited banking activities. Aegon has major operations in the United States (where it is heavily represented through World Financial Group and Transamerica), the Netherlands and the United Kingdom. In addition, the group is present in a number of other countries including Canada, Brazil, Mexico, Hungary, Poland, Romania, Slovakia, Czech Republic, Turkey, Spain, China, Japan, North America and India.

Aegon's world headquarters are in The Hague, Netherlands.

=== Subsidiaries and divisions ===
==== Netherlands ====
- Aegon Levensverzekering
- Aegon Schadeverzekering
- Aegon Bank, knab
- OPTAS Pensioenen
- Aegon Spaarkas
- Unirobe Meeus Groep
- TKP Pensioen
- Aegon Hypotheken

==== United Kingdom ====
- Scottish Equitable plc (trading as Aegon UK)
- Origen Financial Services
- Positive Solutions
- Cofunds

==== North America ====
- Aegon USA, LLC
- Transamerica Corporation
- World Financial Group (WFG)

==== Other ====
- Aegon España S.A. (Spain)
- Aegon Magyarország Általános Biztositó Zrt. (Hungary)
- Aegon TU na Życie S.A. / Aegon Powszechne Towarzystwo Emerytalne S.A. (Poland)

=== Joint ventures ===
- Aegon-CNOOC Life Insurance Company (50% joint venture with CNOOC) (China)
- Aegon Sony Life Insurance Cy (50% joint venture with Sony) (Japan)
- Aegon Industrial Fund Management Co. (49%) (China)
- AMVEST Vastgoed B.V. (Netherlands

=== Shareholdings ===
- N.V. Levensverzekeringsmaatschappij "De Hoop" (33.3%) (Netherlands)
- Tenet Group Limited (22%) (United Kingdom)
- Seguros Argos (89%) (Mexico)
- Aegon Life Insurance Company Ltd (49%) (India)
- Mongeral Aegon (50%) (Brazil)

== Banking services ==
AEGON also operated a direct bank under the brand name "Knab" in the Netherlands. Soon after it was founded in 2012 the bank came under criticism for having the highest cost for any transaction account compared to other Dutch banks. Knab responded by saying that other banks hid many of its costs in other products.

== Sponsorships ==
In 2008, Aegon became the official sponsor of the Dutch football team AFC Ajax, in a deal which lasted for seven years. Ajax's uniform featured the Aegon logo across the chest. Aegon became the third sponsor of Ajax (TDK sponsored Ajax since 1982 until 1991, and ABN AMRO sponsored the team from 1991 till 2008). As of late 2008, Aegon also sponsor the Lawn Tennis Association. A sponsorship package was agreed with the LTA and Aegon's name will appear on all four pillars of British Tennis, including many professional tournaments, one of which is the AEGON Championships, an ATP grasscourt professional tennis tournament in June in London, taking over from Stella Artois, who had sponsored the event since 1979. Since 2004, Transamerica has been the primary sponsor of the American golfer Zach Johnson. AEGON is one of the strategic industry partners with Duisenberg school of finance.

== Headquarters office ==
Aegon's headquarters have been in Haarlemmermeer (Schiphol) since 2015.
