= ICICI Life Insurance =

Indian Life Insurance Company Pvt Ltd

ICICI Life Insurance Limited
- Type: Public
- Traded as: BSE: 540133; NSE: ICICILI
- ISIN: INE726G01019
- Industry: Financial services
- Founded: 2000; 26 years ago
- Headquarters: Mumbai, India
- Key people: Sandeep Batra (Chairman of the Board of Directors); Sidharatha Mishra (MD & CEO); Judhajit Das (Chief - Service Delivery); Dhiren Salian (CFO)
- Products: Life insurance; Term life insurance; Unit-linked insurance plan; Endowment policy; Money-back policy; Whole life insurance; Retirement plans
- Revenue: ▲₹51,335.63 crore (US$5.5 billion) (2026)
- Net income: ▲₹1,600.36 crore (US$170 million) (2026)
- Total assets: ▲₹312,725.22 crore (US$33 billion) (2026)
- Total equity: ▲₹13,631.15 crore (US$1.5 billion) (2026)
- Number of employees: 20,000
- Parent: ICICI Bank
- Website: www.icicilife.com

ICICI Life Insurance Limited (formerly known as ICICI Prudential Life Insurance Company Limited) is an Indian life insurance company and a subsidiary of ICICI Bank. The company offers a range of life insurance plans to individuals and businesses in India. It was established as a joint venture between ICICI Bank and Prudential plc and is now majority-owned by ICICI Bank.

== History ==
ICICI Life Insurance Limited (formerly known as ICICI Prudential Life Insurance Company Limited) started its operations in 2000. The life insurance arm was established as a joint venture between ICICI Bank Limited and Prudential Corporation Holdings Limited.

In 2016, ICICI Life Insurance Limited (formerly known as ICICI Prudential Life Insurance Company Limited) became the first insurance company to be listed in Indian stock exchanges, namely Bombay Stock Exchange and National Stock Exchange. In the IPO, parent company ICICI Bank Limited offloaded 12.65% stake worth ₹5,000 crore (US$744.1 million).

In 2017, ICICI Life Insurance Limited (formerly known as ICICI Prudential Life Insurance Company Limited) was to take over Sahara Life's insurance business on request from the regulator IRDA in a motive to resolve the crisis at Sahara's life insurance arm. The merger was later revoked by Securities Appellate Tribunal.

As of 31st March 2026, ICICI Life Insurance Limited (formerly known as ICICI Prudential Life Insurance Company Limited) had ₹3,140 billion (US$32.58 billion) in assets under management (AUM).

In October 2026, the company changed its name from ICICI Prudential Life Insurance Company Limited to ICICI Life Insurance Limited, with ICICI Bank becoming the majority shareholder.

== See also ==
- ICICI Bank
- ICICI Lombard General Insurance Company Limited
- List of life insurance companies in India
- SBI Life Insurance Company
- HDFC Life
