= Aegon Targaryen =

Aegon Targaryen refers to multiple characters in George R. R. Martin's A Song of Ice and Fire fantasy franchise:

- Aegon I Targaryen, the first Targaryen king in the backstory of A Song of Ice and Fire
- Aegon II Targaryen, in Fire & Blood and its TV adaptation House of the Dragon
- Aegon III Targaryen, in The Princess and the Queen, the TV adaptation House of the Dragon, and Fire & Blood
- Aegon IV Targaryen, also known as Aegon the Unworthy, mentioned in the Tales of Dunk and Egg stories and its TV adaptation A Knight of the Seven Kingdoms (2026)
- Aegon V Targaryen, also known as Aegon the Unlikely, in the Tales of Dunk and Egg stories and its TV adaptation A Knight of the Seven Kingdoms as Prince Aegon or "Egg" (2026)
- Aegon VI Targaryen, the son of Rhaegar Targaryen and Elia Martell in the backstory of A Song of Ice and Fire, and a character in A Dance with Dragons (2011)
- Jon Snow (character), the secret son of Rhaegar Targaryen and Lyanna Stark in the TV adaptation Game of Thrones, born Aegon Targaryen

== See also ==
- Aemon Targaryen
