= SBI Life Insurance Company =

Indian life insurance company limited

SBI Life Insurance company limited
- Type: Public
- Traded as: BSE: 540719; NSE: SBILIFE; NSE NIFTY 50 constituent
- Industry: Financial services
- Founded: March 2001
- Headquarters: Mumbai, India
- Area served: Worldwide
- Key people: Mr. Amit Jhigran (MD & CEO)
- Products: Life insurance; Term life insurance; Unit-linked insurance plan; Endowment policy; Money-back policy; Whole life insurance; Retirement plans
- Revenue: ▼₹80,686 crore (US$8.4 billion) (2023)
- Operating income: ▲₹2,004 crore (US$210 million) (2023)
- Net income: ▲₹1,721 crore (US$180 million) (2023)
- Total assets: ▲₹353,422 crore (US$37 billion) (2024)
- Total equity: ▲₹13,017 crore (US$1.4 billion) (2023)
- Owner: State Bank Of India
- Number of employees: 29,344 ( April 2026 )
- Website: SBI Life

SBI Life Insurance Company Limited is an Indian life insurance company. It was started as a joint venture between State Bank of India (SBI) and French financial institution BNP Paribas Cardif.

In 2007, CRISIL Limited, a subsidiary of global rating agency Standard & Poor's, gave the company a AAA/Stable/P1+ rating. SBI Life is listed on BSE And NSE (Stock Exchanges in India) and is a life insurance company in India.

== Technology ==
In May 2026, SBI Life Insurance implemented an artificial intelligence-based underwriting system developed by Datamatics. The system, called TruAI Underwriting, is designed to automate the analysis of medical reports and assist in risk evaluation for complex insurance cases.

== History ==
The company incorporated in Mumbai on 11 October 2000. SBI Life started as a joint venture with BNP Cardif S.A in 2001. In its initial stage its business was mainly from bancassurance channel.
