= Premium financing =

Premium financing is the lending of funds to a person or company to cover the cost of an insurance premium. Premium finance loans are often provided by a third party finance entity known as a premium financing company; however insurance companies and insurance brokerages occasionally provide premium financing services through premium finance platforms. The premium finance market has a few segments; commercial lines property and casualty, personal lines property and casualty, and life insurance.

To finance a premium, the individual or company requesting insurance must sign a premium finance agreement with the premium finance company. The loan arrangement may last from one year to the life of the policy. The premium finance company then pays the insurance premium and bills the individual or company, usually in monthly installments, for the cost of the loan.

Businesses which engage in property and casualty financing range from small privately-held entities to fortune 100 companies. Clients that engage in life insurance financing are typically aged 29 to 75; with a net worth of $5 million or greater. Life insurance financing is popular when interest rates are low.

== Commercial property and casualty financing ==
The commercial P&C market is estimated to be more than $50 billion as of 2026 and regulated at the state level by the states equivalent of the division of insurance or division of banking.

A large number of commercial insurance policies are placed through surplus lines insurance companies which require payment in full at the inception of the policy. Thus the need for premium financing which allows business to preserve cash flow for payroll, investment in R&D, or other management priorities.

Traditional loan terms require a down payment, which provides equity in the underlying insurance policy, and 9 or 10 monthly installment payments thereafter. The standard premium finance agreement gives the lender power of attorney over the underlying insurance policy which protects the lenders collateral for the loan, the insurance policy, in the event of non-payment from the borrower.

The industry is composed of private lenders and banks which range in size from tens of millions of annual premiums financed up to the largest lenders which finance tens of billions annually. The National Premium Finance Association has information on premium finance.

== Life insurance premium financing ==
- In traditional recourse premium finance, the client enters a fully collateralized loan arrangement with the intention of holding the life insurance policy to maturity. Traditional financing arrangements are generally purchased for estate liquidity needs and offer the most advantageous loan rates, fees, and spreads. The client may have an exit strategy using other assets in the estate. Traditional finance is particularly effective for clients who have a large but illiquid net worth.

In non-recourse premium finance and Hybrid Premium Finance are available.

The collateralized investments may be held by the insured's investment team as long as the collateral money is pledged annually with third party verification of the funds. This is not suitable for the client that has primarily illiquid funds such as real estate. Cash investments are the accepted collateral.

Currently, specialty premium finance platforms exist to establish consistency and reliability in premium finance transactions.

Most advisers are using premium finance platforms to aid in the case design, maintenance (annual servicing) of life insurance premium finance cases, thereby mitigating any inherent risk.

== Benefits ==
There are a number of benefits to financing insurance premiums. These include the following:

- Eliminates the requirement for a large up-front payment to an insurance company.
- Multiple insurance policies can be attached to a single premium finance contract, allowing for a single payment plan to cover all insurance coverage.
- Premium financing is often transparent to the individual or company insured. Brokers transmit the completed premium finance agreement to the premium finance company, and the policy holder is billed as they would be for any other typical insurance policy.
- It allows for clients to obtain needed coverage without liquidating other assets.

The main benefit in premium financing is the avoiding the opportunity cost in paying out of pocket. By using other people's money (leveraging a lender's capital), clients can retain a significant amount of capital known as retained capital

The typical LIFE client profile consists of age 29 to 75, net worth $5 million or greater; Business-owner, entrepreneur, professional; Desire to retain capital whilst maximizing wealth transfer and potential tax-free retirement, especially with advent of indexed universal life insurance and premium finance strategies for these chassis.

== Risks and mitigation ==
=== Interest rate volatility risk ===
Since the interest due on the money lent to pay premiums is tied to an index, usually the LIBOR (London Interbank Offered Rate) or Prime if interest rates rise, the total interest charge will rise as well. If the policy owner can't afford to pay interest payments then they stand to lose their insurance and be left with significant debt if the surrender value of the policy is less than the balance owed. If this becomes the case the client would have not been able to pay the premiums on a non financed policy in any event so as with anything else make sure your can afford the policy. Lenders may take this risk into account when they do their financial underwriting. Typical loan rates are pegged to one year LIBOR with a competitive spread of ~ 180 bit/s. Most borrowing rates can be anticipated from 2.5% to 6%; depending on the fluctuation of 1 year LIBOR + the fixed spread.

=== Renewal risk ===
The lender may have the right to call the loan at the end of the term. Virtually all premium financing loans have terms of a duration less than the life of the policy.

=== Carrier credit rating risk ===
Financing terms are sensitive to the credit rating of the carrier holding the financed policy. Carrier downgrades may result in the lender choosing to not pay additional premiums, requiring the borrower to post additional collateral or call the loan and collapse all the collateral to cover any moneys due to the Lender. Most premium finance platforms require carriers to be S&P rated A or greater.

=== Crediting rate risk ===
Carriers choose the crediting rate of in-force blocks of business at-will. Current crediting rates are not guaranteed. As such, any illustrated arbitrage in interest rates between the policy crediting rate and the loan interest rate may not exist in the future.

=== Credit spread risk - LIFE ===
Life insurance carriers and premium finance lenders use the same fundamental financial instruments. Carriers fund insurance contracts with corporate debt. Lenders provide liquidity at personal debt rates. Corporate debt yields are less than personal debt rates. As such, premium financing may carry a negative spread for the client financing the premiums. Indexed Universal Life insurance, through Indexing, may provide the policy the interest crediting needed to support the arbitrage.

=== Collateral risk - LIFE ===
Most premium financing arrangements that are designed to provide liquidity to the client at death are 100% collateralized. In most cases, the client must either post a Letter of Credit (LOC), securities accounts, other non-financed life insurance policies, annuities or any other hard assets approved by Lender to satisfy collateral. Collateral requirements may vary with economic conditions and could force the client to liquidate positions in order to post collateral. Furthermore, a decrease in the value of collateralized assets (such as real estate or securities) may require the insured or their estate to post additional collateral.

=== Settlement risk - LIFE ===
Settlement risk pertains to Life Settlement transactions, not all premium finance transactions.

Some premium financing programs are sold under the assumption that the policy will have a substantial market value at the end of the term. The client can then exit the financing arrangement and realize a gain on the investment. The secondary life insurance market is highly volatile. Settlement offers will vary with the interest rate environment and the degree to which capital will "wait" for a return. Any premium finance program or broker that induces you to enter into a premium finance transaction with the sole purpose of selling the policy after the policy is no longer contestable by the issuing carrier (generally two years) may be illegal and violate state "insurable interest" laws.

=== Insurable interest ===
Insurable interest is a concept that dates back to the English legal system. Wagering on the life of an insured was common, and many times a person with no interest, economic or otherwise, would take out a life insurance contract on a sea captain running dangerous routes, a boxer facing a deadly opponent, etc.

This caused the English courts to declare that an individual taking out a life insurance contract on the life of an insured must have an "insurable interest" in their life. This means, in its simplest terms, you must benefit more by having the individual insured alive, than dead. Direct blood relatives certainly have an insurable interest in a family member. A business partner can have an insurable interest in another business partner.

Insurable interest either exists when a policy is issued, or it does not. If an insured is premium financing a policy, and his direct blood relatives are named as the beneficiaries when the policy is issued, then insurable interest is never an issue. If an insured changes ownership of the policy as soon as it is issued, but the beneficiaries are related by blood when the policy was issued, there is no insurable interest issues.

Life insurance is personal property. It is like a car, a home or any other asset. the owner has the right to pledge it, sell it or change ownership of it as long as it was issued with the death benefit going to a blood relative or related party, that benefits by having you alive.

Recent court cases have been hearing arguments from insurance carriers regarding the sale, or transfer of ownership of policies in courts around the nation (circa 2010) by insureds that have sold their policies to investors. The courts have overwhelmingly found in favor of the insureds, finding that insurable interest existed at the time the policy was issued, and there for the right to sell or transfer the policy after issuance was the choice of the insured enjoyed by any asset holder. Many life insurance carriers have tried, and generally unsuccessfully, to challenge these sales based on insurable interest or by trying to prove that the insured "intended" to sell the policy. The courts have found that "intent" is irrelevant, when insurable interest exists at policy issuance.

== Current environment - LIFE ==
Premium financing arrangements were under intense scrutiny. In-force financed policies are being called for collateral in large numbers. Clients who are "underwater", where the loan balance exceeds the policy cash value, are being forced to post additional collateral at low risk-weighted rates and/or surrender the policies and pay the outstanding loan balance out of pocket. Additionally, several carriers who were active in the financing marketplace have been downgraded, causing large-scale exchanges or surrenders from in-force policies.

Currently, premium financing is becoming a more regulated industry. All financing sources must be carrier approved, and most lenders have substantial (billions) in assets. Some are specialized premium finance lenders and most are large institutions. Advisers generally use a preferred premium finance platform to assist in properly structuring and maintaining (servicing on an annual basis) life insurance premium finance cases.

Advisers are increasingly concerned about the structure of premium finance transactions and are more fully utilizing information and professional services to include specialized premium finance platforms. With the more recent advent of indexed universal life insurance policies premium finance transactions are becoming popular for their significant retained capital and potential tax-free retirement accumulation.
