= Aegon UK =

Pensions and life assurance company

Scottish Equitable plc
- Type: Subsidiary
- Industry: Financial services
- Founded: 1831; 195 years ago, as Scottish Equitable
- Headquarters: Edinburgh, Scotland, UK
- Key people: Mike Holliday-Williams, CEO
- Products: Pensions, Investment, Protection
- Parent: Aegon Ltd
- Website: www.aegon.co.uk

Aegon UK (Aegon) is an Edinburgh based financial services provider specialising in pensions, investments and insurance.

Aegon is the brand name for Scottish Equitable plc and it is a subsidiary of Aegon Ltd, a multi-national life insurance, pension and asset management company headquartered in Bermuda.

== History ==
The Scottish Equitable Life Assurance Society was founded in Edinburgh in 1831 and in 1861 it began paying out its first pension to a customer.

In 1994, the company became Scottish Equitable plc with Aegon N.V. buying a 40% stake in the business. Aegon NV increased that stake to 100% by 1998.

In 2006 Scottish Equitable plc was rebranded as Aegon Scottish Equitable and in 2009 this was shortened to Aegon, although the legal entity is still Scottish Equitable plc.

Aegon acquired Cofunds, a UK based investment and administration service in 2016.

In May 2016 Aegon announced that it would acquire BlackRock's UK defined contribution platform (including Master Trust) and administration business, with the transfer completing in 2018. The Master Trust was authorised by The Pensions Regulator in September 2019.

In March 2020, Mike Holliday-Williams became the new CEO following the retirement of Adrian Grace after 10 years with Aegon.

In April 2021, Aegon acquired Pension Geeks.

== Products and customers ==
Aegon is a financial services provider with products designed for individuals and business customers. Its products are available through financial advisers or in the case of workplace pensions, made available via an employer. It offers a range of pensions, individual savings accounts (ISAs), life insurance and investment products for individual customers. It offers workplace pensions, including a Master Trust option.

In the UK, Aegon has over 3.8 million customers and manages around £214bn of customers’ savings (as at 31 December 2021).

=== Retiready ===
Retiready is a free digital retirement, saving and planning service provided by pension, insurance and investment company Aegon UK. It is designed to help people assess what their income needs will be in retirement and choose suitable products to achieve them.

Aegon UK launched Retiready in April 2014.

== People and locations ==
Aegon has over 2,000 UK employees (as at 31 December 2021) working from offices in Edinburgh, London, Lytham St Annes, Peterborough and Witham.

It offers employees career opportunities including graduate apprenticeships while working and a marketing graduate scheme.

In 2021, Aegon was formally recognised as a Living Wage Employer. It is also a signatory of the Women in Finance Charter and the Race at Work Charter.

== Executives ==
Executive committee

- Chief Executive Officer, Mike Holliday-Williams, appointed 2019
- Chief Financial Officer, Jim Ewing, appointed 2021
- Chief Risk Officer, Alison Morris, appointed 2022
- Chief Marketing Officer, Andy Manson, appointed 2016
- Chief Technology Officer, Nick Rodway, appointed 2019
- Chief Internal Auditor, Mohit Dhingra, appointed 2023
- Chief HR Officer, Arlene Stokes, appointed 2022
- General Counsel and Company Secretary, James Mackenzie, appointed 2012
- Chief Service Officer, Dougy Grant, appointed 2020
- Chief Distribution Officer, Ronnie Taylor, appointed 2018
- Transformation Director, Sarah Barry, appointed 2021
