= TATA AIG =

Indian general insurance company and joint venture pvt ltd

Tata AIG General Insurance Company Limited
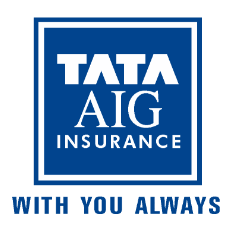
- Type: Private
- Industry: Financial services
- Founded: 2001; 25 years ago
- Headquarters: Mumbai, Maharashtra, India
- Key people: Amit Ganorkar (MD & CEO)
- Products: Health insurance Travel insurance Vehicle insurance
- Services: General insurance
- Revenue: ▲₹15,423.55 crore (US$1.6 billion) (2024)
- Operating income: ▲₹915.36 crore (US$95 million) (2024)
- Net income: ▲₹684.92 crore (US$71 million) (2024)
- Owner: Tata Sons (74%); American International Group (26%)
- Website: www.tataaig.com

TATA AIG General Insurance Company Limited is an Indian general insurance company headquartered in Mumbai, Maharashtra, and is a joint venture between the Tata Group and American International Group (AIG).

The company is owned by the Tata Group and American International Group (AIG), with shareholding split at 74% and 26%, respectively.

The company uses a multi-channel distribution model, offering products through agents, brokers, banks, and direct channels including telemarketing and digital marketing. Tata AIG holds an approximate 6% market share in the Indian general insurance sector, making it the third-largest private general insurer in India.

It offers a range of general insurance products including insurance for automobile, home, personal accident, travel, energy, marine, property and casualty as well as specialized financial lines.

== History ==
Tata AIG was formed in 2001 as a joint venture between the Tata Group and American International Group following the liberalization of India's insurance sector.

In October 2001, Tata AIG partnered with IDBI Bank Insurance Consultancy to distribute its general insurance products, starting with the personal accident policy Futureguard via select IDBI Bank ATMs in Mumbai. In November 2001, Tata AIG received approval from the Insurance Regulatory and Development Authority to introduce group pension products, becoming the first private insurer in India to do so.

In 2002, the company partnered with various non-governmental organizations to tap into the rural market and develop new insurance products. At the same time, it launched a new personal accident insurance policy named "Shanti," with Naseeruddin Shah as its brand ambassador. In March 2002, it partnered with Thomas Cook to sell international travel insurance products. By the end of the 2002 fiscal year, rural policies made up 11% of Tata AIG's total policies, above the mandated minimum of 5%.

In May 2014, Tata AIG established the Tata AIG Academy to educate its distributors. It partnered with India Post Payments Bank to distribute its non-life insurance products in September 2021.

In May 2024, Tata AIG launched a Satellite In-Orbit Liability policy, reportedly the first in the country. In June 2024, it was reported to have issued a performance surety bond valued at over ₹100 crore, described as the largest in India.

== Marketing ==
Tata AIG has associated with a number of personalities and campaigns as part of its marketing strategy. In the mid-2000s, actor Naseeruddin Shah was featured as a brand ambassador in Tata AIG's advertising campaigns. In 2004, cricket commentator Harsha Bhogle was appointed as brand ambassador. In 2009, the company introduced the animated characters Sukhi and Dukhi as mascots in its advertising campaigns.

Since 2021, actor Ranbir Kapoor has served as the company's brand ambassador and has appeared in a few advertising campaigns, including one alongside filmmaker Rohit Shetty.

== Financials ==
In 2024, Tata AIG General Insurance had revenue of ₹11,408 crore and net operating income of ₹11,381 crore, while recording a profit of ₹685 crore and a net worth of ₹4,677 crore.

It reported revenues of ₹10,242 crore in 2023, ₹8,170 crore in 2022, and ₹6,084 crore in 2021, with corresponding profits of ₹553 crore, ₹454 crore, and ₹448 crore, respectively.

Between 2015 and 2024, it reported steady expansion across financial metrics. Revenue grew from ₹2,400 crore in 2016 to ₹11,408 crore in 2024, while profit increased from ₹20 crore in 2015 to ₹685 crore. Assets rose from ₹1,047 crore to ₹9,706 crore, and net worth expanded from ₹835 crore to ₹4,677 crore during the same period.

== Controversies ==
In October 2022, the company reported a cyber fraud of over ₹54 lakh to law enforcement. The fraud was uncovered during an internal audit that found 434 policies for commercial four- and three-wheelers had been fraudulently issued as two-wheelers, allowing for a lower premium. The company subsequently rejected all fraudulent policies.

In October 2024, Tata AIG General Insurance suffered a data breach. The Insurance Regulatory and Development Authority of India directed the company to appoint independent auditors, while Tata AIG stated it had isolated affected systems and engaged external cybersecurity experts.

== Awards and recognition ==
Forbes has ranked the company on its "World's Best Insurance Firms" list for 2025, placing it at #6 for Auto and #5 for Homeowners. The company was listed on the Fortune 500 India list, ranking #214 and #215 for the years 2024 and 2023, respectively. In 2012, the company was named Claims Service Company of the Year and also won the Best Non-Urban Coverage Award at the Indian Insurance Awards. In 2011, it was named Health Insurance Company of the Year and also won the Best Product Innovation Award in the general insurance category at the Indian Insurance Awards.
