= Bandhan Life =

Indian life insurance company private ltd

Bandhan Life Insurance Limited
- Formerly: Aegon Life Insurance Company
- Type: Private company
- Industry: Financial services Insurance
- Founded: 2008; 18 years ago
- Founders: Aegon N.V.; Times Group
- Headquarters: Mumbai, India
- Area served: India
- Key people: Satishwar Balakrishnan (MD and CEO)
- Products: Insurance
- Owner: Aegon N.V. (49%, 2008-24); Times Group (51%, 2008-24); Bandhan Financial Holdings (2024–present)
- Website: www.bandhanlife.com

Bandhan Life Insurance Limited (formerly known as Aegon Life Insurance Company) is an Indian life insurance company offering individual and group insurance online and offline. Founded in 2008, it is headquartered in Mumbai, India.

Until 2024, it was a joint venture between Dutch Aegon N.V., a multinational insurance, pensions and asset management company and The Times Group (also called Bennett, Coleman & Co.)

In February 2024, it was announced that the firm was acquired by Bandhan Financial Holdings Ltd. On April 19, 2024, Aegon Life was officially rebranded as Bandhan Life.

== Corporate history ==
In July 2006, AEGON and the Ranbaxy Group announced its intention to enter the insurance business in India. The partnership of AEGON, Religare & Bennett, Coleman & Company formed AEGON Religare Life Insurance Company Limited and launched in July 2008.

In 2015, Aegon increased its stake in the venture to 49% while Religare Enterprises announced it was exiting the venture by selling its entire shareholding in the company, 44%, to Bennett, Coleman and Company, the holding company of the Times Group. This led to the rebranding from Aegon Religare Life Insurance Company to Aegon Life Insurance Company.

In September 2019, it partnered with Paytm to offer comprehensive insurance products. In March 2020, the company entered into partnership with Flipkart to sell paperless life insurance policies on their platform.

== Recognition ==
- In 2019, Aegon Life Insurance was awarded as eBusiness Leader – Medium & Small at World BFSI Award by World BFSI Congress.
- Aegon Religare Life Insurance awarded as E-Business Leader by Indian Insurance Award in 2013.
- In 2025, Bandhan Life was certified as a Great Place to Work®.

== See also ==
- List of insurance companies in India
