= Nippon Life =

Japanese life insurance company

Nippon Life Insurance Company
- Type: Public
- Industry: Financial services
- Founded: July 4, 1889; 137 years ago in Osaka, Japan
- Founder: Sukesaburo Hirose
- Headquarters: Osaka, Japan
- Area served: Japan and international markets through subsidiaries and affiliates
- Key people: Hiroshi Shimizu (Chairman); Satoshi Asahi (President)
- Products: Life insurance, Term life insurance, Whole life insurance, annuities, Health insurance, Medical insurance, Group insurance, Pension products and Asset management
- Revenue: ▲¥14.77 trillion (2025) (US$93.33 billion)
- Operating income: ▼¥105.2 billion (2025) (US$664.47 million)
- Net income: ▲¥606.45 billion (2025) (US$3.83 billion)
- Total assets: ▲¥118.86 trillion (2025) (US$750.79 billion)
- Total equity: ▲¥11.21 trillion (2025) (US$70.8 billion)
- Owner: Policyholders (mutual company)
- Number of employees: 172,869 (2026)
- Website: www.nissay.co.jp/global/
- Footnotes; Consolidated Nippon Life Group figures for FY2025, ended 31 March 2026. Assets, equity and employee count are as of 31 March 2026. Financial figures are reported in Japanese yen.

Nippon Life Insurance Company (Japanese: 日本生命保険相互会社, Hepburn: Nihon Seimei Hoken Sōgo-gaisha), also known as Nissay (Japanese: ニッセイ, Hepburn: Nissei) or Nihon Seimei (日本生命) is the largest Japanese life insurance company by revenue. The company was founded in 1889 as the Nippon Life Assurance Co., Inc. In structure it is a mutual company. It first paid policyholder dividends in 1898.

== Overview ==
Nippon Life Insurance Company was formed on 4 July 1889 by Sukesaburo Hirose in Osaka, Japan. Nippon Life employs 70,519 employees and has 70,608 billion yen in assets as of 2016. The company is headquartered in Imabashi Sanchōme, Chūō-ku, Osaka, Japan. It has a wholly owned subsidiary, Resolution Life, which operates in Southeast Asia and the United States.

In October 2026, Nippon Life India AMC got approval by Securities and Exchange Board of India (SEBI) for ₹96.8 crore to settlement for Yes Bank AT1 case.
