= IndusInd Nippon Life Insurance =

Indian insurance and finance company limited

IndusInd Nippon Life Insurance Company Limited
- Formerly: Reliance Nippon Life Insurance Company Limited (2001 - 2025)
- Type: Joint venture
- Industry: Financial services
- Founded: 14 May 2001
- Headquarters: Bandra Kurla Complex, Mumbai, Mumbai, India
- Key people: Ashish Vohra (Executive Director & CEO)
- Products: Life insurance Investment management
- Parent: IndusInd Capital(Hinduja Group); Nippon Life
- Website: www.indusindnipponlife.com

IndusInd Nippon Life Insurance Company Limited (INLIC), formerly known as Reliance Nippon Life Insurance Company Limited (CIN: U66010MH2001PLC167089), is an Indian private life insurance company headquartered in Mumbai and regulated by the Insurance Regulatory and Development Authority of India (IRDAI). The company caters to individual and group segments across protection, children, retirement, and investment plans.

== History ==
The company was established in 2001, brings together the legacy of IndusInd International Holdings Ltd. (IIHL) inspired by the enduring strength and prosperity of the Indus Valley civilization, and Nippon, representing global excellence, discipline, and trust. Together, it combines Indian values with international standards of service and governance. The company serves individual and group customers, offering insurance products across protection, children's, retirement, and investment segments.

2011	Nippon Life signs definitive agreement to acquire 26% of the company.
2016	Nippon acquires 49% stake in Reliance Life Insurance Company
March 2025	Hinduja Group takes over Reliance remaining 51% of shares
December 2025	Name changed to IndusInd Nippon Life Insurance Co. Ltd.

== Description ==
As of FY2026, IndusInd Nippon Life Insurance reported its highest-ever financial performance, with net profits rising 15% to ₹248 crore and an 18% growth in New Business Premium. The insurer maintains a highly stable financial footprint with a solvency ratio of 218%, significantly above the statutory requirement, and a strong claims settlement ratio of 98.94%. Under the leadership of CEO Ashish Vohra, the company serves over 10 million policyholders through an active network of 713 branches and 68,793 advisors.

== Products and Services ==
The company offers a comprehensive portfolio of life insurance products designed to cater to diverse customer needs across various life stages. Its retail offerings are structured into distinct categories, including pure term protection plans that provide comprehensive financial security to families against unforeseen events. For wealth creation, the insurer provides unit-linked insurance plans (ULIPs) that combine market-linked investment returns with a life insurance cover, allowing policyholders to choose equity and debt fund options based on their risk appetite.

Additionally, the firm provides traditional savings and investment plans, including both participating and non-participating structures, which offer guaranteed returns or bonuses to fulfill long-term financial milestones. To address retirement requirements, the portfolio includes deferred and immediate annuity plans designed to provide a steady, post-retirement stream of income. The company also extends its product line to include specialized group life insurance plans, catering to corporate employee benefits, credit-linked protection schemes, and gratuity solutions for businesses.

== See also ==
- Hinduja Group
- Nippon Life
