= Commercial finance =

Function of offering loans to businesses

In the United States, commercial finance is the function of offering loans to businesses. Commercial financing is generally offered by a bank or other commercial lender. Most commercial banks offer commercial financing, and the loans are either secured by business assets or alternatively can be unsecured, where the lender relies on the cash flows of the business to repay the facility.

Assets used to collateralize commercial finance loans include:

- Real estate
- Receivables from invoices
- Equipment or supplies

While qualifying for financing is generally easier for large, well-established companies, some small businesses can qualify for commercial financing from the Small Business Administration (SBA). The SBA may provide either financing or insure a lender who takes a risk on a smaller company to provide commercial finance.

Businesses can also seek the assistance of Commercial finance advisors in the structuring and sourcing of commercial finance. These are known as Independent Financial Advisers or Commercial Finance Brokers.

== Types of commercial finance ==
Commercial finance encompasses a range of lending products designed to meet business funding needs. Common forms include term loans, lines of credit, asset-based lending, and commercial real estate loans. Term loans provide a fixed amount of capital repaid over a defined schedule, while lines of credit allow businesses to draw funds as needed up to a specified limit.

Asset-based lending allows businesses to secure financing using collateral such as accounts receivable, inventory, or equipment. Commercial real estate loans are used to finance property intended for business use. These lending structures vary in terms, risk assessment, and collateral requirements depending on the size and financial condition of the borrowing firm.

== See also ==
- Finance
