= Bancassurance =

Insurance offered to customers of a bank

Bancassurance is a relationship between a bank and an insurance company that is aimed at offering insurance products or insurance benefits to the bank's customers. In this partnership, bank staff and tellers become the point of sale and point of contact for the customer. Bank staff are advised and supported by the insurance company through wholesale product information, marketing campaigns and sales training. The bank and the insurance company share the commission. Insurance policies are processed and administered by the insurance company.

This partnership arrangement can be profitable for both companies. Banks can earn additional revenue by selling the insurance products, while insurance companies are able to expand their customer base without having to expand their sales forces or pay commissions to insurance agents or brokers. Bancassurance has proved to be an effective distribution channel in a number of countries in Europe, Latin America, Asia, and Australia.

== Description ==
BIM (Banking Insurance Model) differs from the classic or Traditional Insurance Model (TIM) in that TIM insurance companies tend to have larger insurance sales teams and generally work with brokers and third-party agents. An additional approach, the Hybrid Insurance Model (HIM), is a mix between BIM and TIM. HIM insurance companies may have a sales force, may use brokers and agents and may have a partnership with a bank. BIM is extremely popular in European countries such as Spain, France, and Austria.

The use of the term picked up as banks and insurance companies merged and banks sought to provide insurance, especially in markets that have been liberalised recently. It is a controversial idea, and many feel it gives banks too great control over the financial industry or creates too much competition with existing insurers.

In some countries, bank insurance is still largely prohibited, but it was recently legalized in countries such as when the Glass–Steagall Act was repealed after the passage. But revenues have been modest and flat in recent years, and most insurance sales in U.S. banks are for mortgage insurance, life insurance or property insurance related to loans. But China recently allowed banks to buy insurers and vice versa, stimulating the bancassurance product, and some major global insurers in China have seen the bancassurance product greatly expand sales to individuals across several product lines.

Private-bankassurance is a wealth management process pioneered by Lombard International Assurance and is now used globally. The concept combines private banking and investment management services with the sophisticated use of life assurance as a financial planning structure to achieve fiscal advantages and security for wealthy investors and their families. The banks are the agent of the insurance companies to sell them more and more policies. Bancassurance is an efficient distribution channel with higher productivity and lower costs than the traditional distribution channel.

In the modern bancassurance module, there has a staff assigned by an insurance company placed in particular banks to serve banking customers with their insurance solutions.

== Business models across the world ==
'Integrated models' is insurance activity deeply integrated with bank's processes. Premium is usually collected by the bank, usually direct debit from the customer's account held in that bank. New business data entry is done in the bank branches and workflows between the bank and the insurance companies are automated. In most cases, asset management is done by the bank's asset management subsidiary.

Insurance products are distributed by branch staff, which is sometimes supported by specialised insurance advisers for more sophisticated products or for certain types of clients. Life insurance products are fully integrated with the bank's range of savings and investment products and the trend is for branch staff to sell a growing number of insurance products that are becoming farther removed from its core business, e.g., protection, health, or non-life products.

Products are mainly medium- and long-term tax-advantaged investment products. They are designed specifically for bancassurance channels to meet the needs of branch advisers in terms of simplicity and similarity with banking products. In particular, these products often have a low-risk insurance component.

Bank branches receive commissions for the sale of life insurance products. Part of the commissions can be paid to branch staff as commissions or bonuses based on the achievement of sales targets.

'Non-integrated Models' – The sale of life insurance products by branch staff has been limited by regulatory constraints since most investment-based products can only be sold by authorised financial advisers who have obtained a minimum qualification.

Banks have therefore set up networks of financial advisers authorised to sell regulated insurance products. They usually operate as tied agents and sell exclusively the products manufactured by the bank's in-house insurance company or its third-party provider(s).

A proactive approach is used to generate leads for the financial advisers from the customer base, including through mailings and telesales. There is an increasing focus on developing relationships with a large number of customers who rarely or never visit a bank branch.

Financial planners are typically employed by the bank or building society rather than the life company and usually receive a basic salary plus a bonus element based on a combination of factors including sales volumes, persistence, and product mix.

Following the reform of the polarisation regime, banks will have the possibility to become multi-tied distributors offering a range of products from different providers. This has the potential to strengthen the position of bancassurers by allowing them to meet their customers' needs.

== Conclusion ==
Bancassurance plays a major role in worldwide insurance and dominates several major European markets such as France and Italy. Its market share is expected to accrue with the deregulation taking place in several Asian countries and in the UK.

Bancassurance encompasses a variety of business models. These business models generally fall into three categories:

- Integrated models (where the bancassurance activity is closely tied to the banking business).
- Advice-based models (where there is less integration and the distribution is based on using professional insurance advisers to sell to the clients of the bank).
- Open architecture models.

The business model tends to impact all aspects of the bancassurance activity including the company structure, sales and marketing, product design, and sales remuneration. In most countries, bancassurance has tended to see a gradual evolution in the products offered from a protection business closely related to the banks lending activity to a general savings business and finally to a wider range of protection products.

In many countries, the choice of a business model is influenced by regulatory constraints (e.g., the minimum qualification required to sell insurance products, the type of products that banks are allowed to sell, or the nature of the relationship between banks and insurance companies).

Bancassurance can be an efficient distribution mechanism with potentially higher sales and lower costs than traditional, segregated, distribution channels, in other words, in additional cost and revenue synergies. These advantages are positively correlated to the degree of integration of the banking and insurance products, although there is no evidence showing the precise extent of the relationship between the two. The collapse of Fortis in Belgium, and the withdrawal of other players from the bancassurance market, since the crisis, has led to a reduced level of interest in this area.
