= Unit-linked insurance plan =

Product offered by insurance companies

A unit-linked insurance plan is a product offered by insurance companies that, unlike a pure insurance policy, gives investors both insurance and financial investment under a single integrated plan.

== India ==
Unit-linked funds insurance plans existed pre-2000. An early adopter for unit-linked insurance plan was launched by Unit Trust of India.

=== Charges ===
Unlike traditional insurance policies, unit-linked insurance plans have a list of applicable charges that are deducted from the payable premium.

=== Providers ===
There are several public and private sector insurance providers that either operate solo or have partnered with foreign insurance companies to sell unit-linked insurance plans in India.

The public insurance provider include LIC of India while some of the private insurance providers include Aegon Life, Canara, Edelweiss Tokio Life Insurance, Reliance Life, SBI Life, ICICI Prudential, HDFC Life, Bajaj Allianz, Aviva Life Insurance, Max life insurance, Kotak Mahindra Life, and DHFL Pramerica Life Insurance. FWU is covering the Europe market.

=== Tax benefits ===
Investments in unit-linked insurance plans are eligible for tax benefit up to a maximum of Rs 1.5 lacs under Section 80C of the Income Tax Act.

Maturity proceeds are also exempt from income tax. There is a caveat. The Sum Assured or the minimum death benefit must be at least 10 times the annual premium. If this condition is not met, the benefit under Section 80C shall be capped at 10% of Sum Assured while the maturity proceeds will not be exempt from income tax.
