= List of pension schemes in Hong Kong =

Hong Kong pension schemes include various retirement protection schemes in Hong Kong. This article lists pension schemes in Hong Kong that are more widely known to the general public, including the Mandatory Provident Fund (MPF) schemes, statutory pension schemes and several occupational retirement registered schemes.

== Mandatory Provident Fund schemes ==
The following list of Mandatory Provident Fund (MPF) schemes is based on the register of MPF schemes and the list of MPF approved trustees published by the Mandatory Provident Fund Schemes Authority. Since June 2024, the eMPF Platform, acting as the system operator, has been progressively taking over the scheme administration functions from the existing administrative service providers of the MPF schemes.

MPF schemes by Approved Trustees
Notes: Cititrust, HSBC Institutional Trust Services (Asia) and Sun Life Pension Trust currently no longer act as trustees for any MPF schemes. Explanations: Integrated: Master Trust SchemeIndustry: Industry Scheme
AIA (Trustee)
Scheme	Type	Sponsor	Administrator
AIA MPF - Prime Value Choice	Integrated	AIA	eMPF Platform
Bank Consortium Trust
Scheme	Type	Sponsor	Administrator
AMTD MPF Scheme	Integrated	oOo Securities (HK)	eMPF Platform
BCT (MPF) Industry Choice	Industry	BCT Financial	Bank Consortium Trust
BCT (MPF) Pro Choice	Integrated	BCT Financial	eMPF Platform
BCT Strategic MPF Scheme	Integrated	BCT Financial	eMPF Platform
Manulife RetireChoice (MPF) Scheme	Integrated	Manulife (International)	eMPF Platform
Bank Of Communications Trustee
Scheme	Type	Sponsor	Administrator
BCOM Joyful Retirement MPF Scheme	Integrated	BOCOM MPF & Financial Services	eMPF Platform
Bank of East Asia (Trustees)
Scheme	Type	Sponsor	Administrator
BEA (MPF) Industry Scheme	Industry	Bank of East Asia	Bank of East Asia (Trustees)
BEA (MPF) Master Trust Scheme	Integrated	Bank of East Asia	eMPF Platform
BEA (MPF) Value Scheme	Integrated	Bank of East Asia	eMPF Platform
BOCI-Prudential Trustee
Scheme	Type	Sponsor	Administrator
BOC-Prudential Easy-Choice Mandatory Provident Fund Scheme	Integrated	BOC-Prudential	eMPF Platform
My Choice Mandatory Provident Fund Scheme	Integrated	BOC-Prudential	eMPF Platform
China Life Trustees
Scheme	Type	Sponsor	Administrator
China Life MPF Master Trust Scheme	Integrated	China Life Insurance (Overseas)	eMPF Platform
HSBC Provident Fund Trustee (Hong Kong)
Scheme	Type	Sponsor	Administrator
Fidelity Retirement Master Trust	Integrated	FIL Investment Management (Hong Kong)	HSBC Provident Fund Trustee (Hong Kong)
Haitong MPF Retirement Fund	Integrated	Haitong International Investment Managers	HSBC Provident Fund Trustee (Hong Kong)
Hang Seng Mandatory Provident Fund - SuperTrust Plus	Integrated	Hang Seng Bank	HSBC Provident Fund Trustee (Hong Kong)
HSBC Mandatory Provident Fund - SuperTrust Plus	Integrated	HSBC Hong Kong	HSBC Provident Fund Trustee (Hong Kong)
Manulife Provident Funds Trust
Scheme	Type	Sponsor	Administrator
Manulife Global Select (MPF) Scheme	Integrated	Manulife (International)	Manulife Provident Funds Trust
Principal Trust Company (Asia)
Scheme	Type	Sponsor	Administrator
Principal MPF - Simple Plan	Integrated	Principal Insurance	eMPF Platform
Principal MPF - Smart Plan	Integrated	Principal Insurance	eMPF Platform
Principal MPF Scheme Series 800	Integrated	Principal Insurance	eMPF Platform
Standard Chartered Trustee (Hong Kong)
Scheme	Type	Sponsor	Administrator
SHKP MPF Employer Sponsored Scheme	Employer Sponsored Schemes	Sun Hung Kai Properties	eMPF Platform
Sun Life Trustee
Scheme	Type	Sponsor	Administrator
Sun Life Rainbow MPF Scheme	Integrated	Sun Life Hong Kong	BestServe Financial
YF Life Trustees
Scheme	Type	Sponsor	Administrator
MASS Mandatory Provident Fund Scheme	Integrated	Massachusetts Mutual Life Insurance	eMPF Platform

=== Asset size ===
Ranking of MPF schemes by asset size and market share (2023 – Q2 2025)
Rank	Scheme	Q2 2025		2024		2023	
Rank	Scheme	Size (HK$m)	Share	Size (HK$m)	Share	Size (HK$m)	Share
1	Manulife Global Select	381,341.26	26.68%	349,124.95	27.04%	307,036.00	26.92%
2	HSBC SuperTrust Plus	257,812.30	18.03%	229,791.63	17.80%	200,573.00	17.58%
3	Sun Life Rainbow	156,623.82	10.96%	141,452.59	10.96%	125,686.00	11.02%
4	AIA Prime Value Choice	132,736.01	9.29%	117,999.04	9.14%	102,961.00	9.03%
5	BOC-Prudential Easy-Choice	104,721.36	7.33%	92,376.79	7.15%	79,705.00	6.99%
6	Hang Seng SuperTrust Plus	83,955.67	5.87%	74,658.50	5.78%	64,929.00	5.69%
7	BCT (MPF) Pro Choice	72,136.41	5.05%	64,171.40	4.97%	57,058.00	5.00%
8	Fidelity Retirement Master Trust	61,054.80	4.27%	55,684.99	4.31%	49,466.00	4.34%
9	Principal Series 800	48,294.27	3.38%	45,932.27	3.56%	42,041.00	3.69%
10	BCT Strategic	22,861.23	1.60%	20,702.30	1.60%	19,778.00	1.73%
11	Principal Smart Plan	20,438.09	1.43%	18,938.76	1.47%	17,819.00	1.56%
12	BEA (MPF) Industry Scheme	18,334.06	1.28%	16,843.59	1.30%	15,140.00	1.33%
13	BEA (MPF) Master Trust Scheme	16,914.23	1.18%	15,542.51	1.20%	14,272.00	1.25%
14	Manulife RetireChoice	10,402.88	0.73%	9,417.58	0.73%	8,655.00	0.76%
15	BCOM Joyful Retirement	8,568.68	0.60%	7,781.76	0.60%	7,329.00	0.64%
16	SHKP MPF Employer Sponsored	8,220.37	0.58%	7,485.42	0.58%	6,781.00	0.59%
17	BCT (MPF) Industry Choice	6,751.42	0.47%	6,280.54	0.49%	5,823.00	0.51%
18	MASS	5,397.70	0.38%	4,975.90	0.39%	4,579.00	0.40%
19	China Life MPF	5,020.61	0.35%	4,699.29	0.36%	4,206.00	0.37%
20	My Choice	3,624.53	0.25%	3,326.41	0.26%	3,030.00	0.27%
21	Principal MPF - Simple Plan	2,567.11	0.18%	2,450.87	0.19%	2,398.00	0.21%
22	AMTD	909.17	0.06%	809.94	0.06%	735.00	0.06%
23	Haitong	623.07	0.04%	549.30	0.04%	489.00	0.04%
24	BEA (MPF) Value	220.06	0.02%	194.84	0.02%	168.00	0.01%
Total asset size (HKD)		1,429,529,110,000		1,291,191,170,000		1,140,657,000,000	
MPF market share by Sponsor ranking (2023 – Q2 2025)
Rank	Sponsor	Q2 2025		2024		2023	
Rank	Sponsor	Size (HK$m)	Share	Size (HK$m)	Share	Size (HK$m)	Share
1	Manulife (International)	391,744.14	27.40%	358,542.53	27.77%	315,691.00	27.68%
2	HSBC Hong Kong	257,812.30	18.03%	229,791.63	17.80%	200,573.00	17.58%
3	Sun Life Hong Kong	156,623.82	10.96%	141,452.59	10.96%	125,686.00	11.02%
4	AIA	132,736.01	9.29%	117,999.04	9.14%	102,961.00	9.03%
5	BOC-Prudential	108,345.89	7.58%	95,703.20	7.41%	82,735.00	7.25%
6	BCT Financial	101,749.06	7.12%	91,154.24	7.06%	82,659.00	7.25%
7	Hang Seng Bank	83,955.67	5.87%	74,658.50	5.78%	64,929.00	5.69%
8	Principal Insurance	71,299.47	4.99%	67,321.90	5.21%	62,258.00	5.46%
9	FIL Investment Management (Hong Kong)	61,054.80	4.27%	55,684.99	4.31%	49,466.00	4.34%
10	Bank of East Asia	35,468.35	2.48%	32,580.94	2.52%	29,580.00	2.59%
11	BOCOM MPF & Financial Services	8,568.68	0.60%	7,781.76	0.60%	7,329.00	0.64%
12	Sun Hung Kai Properties	8,220.37	0.58%	7,485.42	0.58%	6,781.00	0.59%
13	Massachusetts Mutual Life Insurance	5,397.70	0.38%	4,975.90	0.39%	4,579.00	0.40%
14	China Life Insurance (Overseas)	5,020.61	0.35%	4,699.29	0.36%	4,206.00	0.37%
15	oOo Securities (HK)	909.17	0.06%	809.94	0.06%	735.00	0.06%
16	Haitong International Investment Managers	623.07	0.04%	549.30	0.04%	489.00	0.04%

== Other pension schemes ==
The following list of pension schemes includes statutory pension schemes, as well as occupational retirement schemes registered under the Mandatory Provident Fund Schemes Authority’s public register and MPF-exempted occupational retirement schemes that are more widely known to the general public.

Pension Scheme	Scheme Type	Administrator
Civil Service Old Pension Schemes	Statutory	The Treasury
Civil Service New Pension Schemes	Statutory	The Treasury
Grant Schools Provident Fund	Statutory	The Treasury
Subsidized Schools Provident Fund	Statutory	The Treasury
Hospital Authority Provident Fund Scheme	ORSO	HSBC Institutional Trust
MTR Corporation Limited Provident Fund Scheme	ORSO	HSBC Institutional Trust
PCCW Retirement Scheme	ORSO	HSBC Institutional Trust
The HSBC Group Hong Kong; Local Staff Retirement Benefit Scheme	ORSO	HSBC Institutional Trust
Cathay Pacific Airways Provident Fund	ORSO	HSBC Institutional Trust
Hutchison Provident Fund	ORSO	HSBC Institutional Trust
New World Development Company Limited Provident Fund Scheme	ORSO	HSBC Provident Fund Trustee
CLP Group Provident Fund Scheme	ORSO	Bank Consortium Trust
Maxim's Caterers Limited Retirement Plan	ORSO	AIA International
Bank of China (Hong Kong) Group Provident Fund Scheme	ORSO	BOCI-Prudential Trustee

== See also ==
- List of banks in Hong Kong
- List of insurance companies in Hong Kong
