= List of insurance companies in Hong Kong =

HK) All insurance companies operating in Hong Kong are subject to regulation by the Insurance Authority (IA), and must be authorised by the IA to carry on insurance business in the territory. Depending on the nature of business, insurance companies in Hong Kong are broadly classified into three main categories: General Business, Long Term Business, and Composite Business.

According to provisional figures published by the Insurance Authority, as of Q1 2025, there were a total of 158 authorised insurers in Hong Kong. However, only 35 were actively participating in the direct individual new business market, which includes medical, critical illness, life protection, savings, and investment-linked life insurance products.

== Insurance companies ==
=== Incorporated in Hong Kong ===
According to information published by the Insurance Authority, as at 26 June 2025, there were a total of 94 insurers incorporated in Hong Kong. These comprised 26 long-term business insurers, 10 composite insurers, and 55 insurers authorised to conduct only general business.

Regulated insurer incorporated in Hong Kong
A: Active long-term business insurer – the insurance company is currently active in the market for direct individual new business. B: Bancassurance – the insurer distributes products primarily through banking channels. C: Captive insurer – a dedicated insurer established to underwrite risks for its parent group. R: Professional reinsurer – provides reinsurance services to other insurers. F: Virtual insurer – authorised through the fast-track regime and operates fully online.
Long-term business
| UBI | Insurer | Established | Notes |
| 37320150 | AIA Everest Life | | |
| 34805305 | AXA Wealth Management (HK)^{A} | | |
| 31221938 | Blue Insurance^{A} | | |
| 20724864 | BOC Group Life Assurance^{AB} | | |
| 68545626 | Bowtie Life Insurance^{AF} | | |
| 73452648 | China Pacific Life Insurance (H.K.)^{A} | | |
| 66961755 | China Reinsurance (Hong Kong)^{R} | | |
| 64995659 | China Taiping Life Insurance (Hong Kong)^{A} | | |
| 36022561 | Chubb Life Insurance Hong Kong^{A} | | |
| 65025504 | Fubon Life Insurance (Hong Kong)^{A} | | |
| 32114500 | FWD Life (Hong Kong) | | |
| 05591749 | FWD Life Assurance Company (Hong Kong) | | |
| 65391492 | Generali Life (Hong Kong)^{A} | | |
| 01816462 | Hang Seng Insurance^{AB} | | |
| 30420587 | Heng An Standard Life (Asia)^{A} | | |
| 67907869 | HKMC Annuity^{A} | | |
| 31578143 | Hong Kong Life Insurance^{A} | | |
| 00992918 | Pacific Life Assurance^{A} | | |
| 20024925 | Principal Insurance Company (Hong Kong) | | |
| 39314925 | Prudential Hong Kong^{A} | | |
| 00058689 | Sincere Life Assurance | | |
| 64458142 | St. James's Place International (Hong Kong)^{A} | | |
| 67027760 | Well Link Life Insurance^{A} | | |
| 04472576 | YF Life Insurance International^{A} | | |
| 70410675 | ZA Life^{AF} | | |
| 69324362 | Zurich Life Insurance (Hong Kong)^{A} | | |
Composite business
| UBI | Insurer | Established | Notes |
| 2047 | AIA | | |
| 5589 | Asia Insurance Company^{A} | | |
| 6165 | AXA China Region Insurance^{A} | | |
| 668 | AXA Life Insurance | | |
| 2945145 | FuSure Reinsurance^{R} | | |
| 51759 | HSBC Insurance (Asia) | | |
| 35496 | Liberty International Insurance^{A} | | |
| 1531647 | Peak Reinsurance^{R} | | |
| 153640 | SCOR Reinsurance Company (Asia)^{R} | | |
| 86424 | Taiping Reinsurance^{R} | | |
General business
| UBI | Insurer | Established | Notes |
| 07227203 | ABCI Insurance | | |
| 00007701 | AIG Insurance Hong Kong | | |
| 36438039 | Arch MI Asia | | |
| 68888444 | Avo Insurance | | |
| 00059520 | AXA General Insurance Hong Kong | | |
| 04441123 | Bank of China Group Insurance | | |
| 31311131 | BC Reinsurance^{R} | | |
| 63299925 | BE Reinsurance^{R} | | |
| 02881781 | Blue Cross (Asia-Pacific) Insurance | | |
| 35808859 | Bolttech Insurance (Hong Kong) | | |
| 07441524 | Bupa (Asia) | | |
| 05042693 | California Insurance Company | | |
| 52589856 | CGN Captive Insurance^{C} | | |
| 19987768 | Chevalier Insurance | | |
| 31415713 | China BOCOM Insurance | | |
| 32179558 | China Overseas Insurance | | |
| 04814748 | China Pacific Insurance Co., (H.K.) | | |
| 05198044 | China Ping An Insurance (Hong Kong) | | |
| 00088175 | China Taiping Insurance (HK) | | |
| 01014472 | Chong Hing Insurance | | |
| 20105113 | Chubb Insurance Hong Kong^{F} | | |
| 36022553 | CIGNA Worldwide General Insurance | | |
| 07181708 | CMB Wing Lung Insurance | | |
| 31195931 | CNOOC Insurance^{C} | | |
| 04746242 | Concord Insurance | | |
| 04893762 | Dah Sing Insurance | | |
| 05895252 | East Point Reinsurance Company of Hong Kong^{R} | | |
| 05064463 | FAI First Pacific Insurance | | In Provisional Liquidation |
| 05313086 | Falcon Insurance Company (Hong Kong) | | |
| 05923722 | HIH Casualty and General Insurance (Asia) | | In Provisional Liquidation |
| 67907851 | HKMC Insurance | | |
| 03843871 | Hong Leong Insurance (Asia) | | |
| 66395065 | Liberty Specialty Markets Hong Kong | | |
| 04095093 | Min Xin Insurance | | |
| 34945375 | MSIG Insurance (Hong Kong) | | |
| 69551286 | OneDegree Hong Kong^{F} | | |
| 01030123 | Pacific Insurance Company | | |
| 00005246 | Paofoong Insurance Company (Hong Kong) | | |
| 03192517 | People's Insurance Company of China (Hong Kong) | | |
| 39870416 | Prudential General Insurance Hong Kong | | |
| 01989895 | QBE Hongkong & Shanghai Insurance | | |
| 35761439 | QBE Mortgage Insurance (Asia) | | |
| 69992931 | Shanghai Electric Insurance^{C} | | |
| 62179552 | Sinopec Insurance^{C} | | |
| 05078101 | Sompo Insurance (Hong Kong) | | |
| 51183916 | Starr International Insurance (Asia) | | |
| 05984263 | Sun Hung Kai Properties Insurance | | |
| 05250290 | Target Insurance Company | | In Liquidation |
| 03850347 | Tokio Marine and Fire Insurance Company (Hong Kong) - The | | |
| 05289455 | Trinity General Insurance | | |
| 02043094 | Tugu Insurance | | |
| 00734659 | United Builders Insurance Company | | |
| 77793379 | Wayfoong (Asia)^{C} | | A captive insurance company established by the HSBC Group. |
| 51311933 | Well Link General Insurance | | |
| 07339917 | Zurich General Insurance (Hong Kong) | | |
Special purpose
| UBI | Insurer | Established | Notes |
| 73854614 | Black Kite Re | | |
| 74452576 | Great Wall Re | | |
| 77228823 | Silk Road Re | | |

=== Incorporated outside Hong Kong ===
According to information published by the Insurance Authority, as at 26 June 2025, there were a total of 64 insurers incorporated outside Hong Kong. These included 25 long-term business insurers, 9 composite insurers, and 30 insurers authorised to conduct only general business.

Regulated insurer incorporated outside Hong Kong
A: Active long-term business insurer – the insurance company is currently active in the market for direct individual new business. B: Bancassurance – the insurer distributes products primarily through banking channels. C: Captive insurer – a dedicated insurer established to underwrite risks for its parent group. R: Professional reinsurer – provides reinsurance services to other insurers. F: Virtual insurer – authorised through the fast-track regime and operates fully online.
Long-term business
| UBI | Country | Insurer | Established | Notes |
| 10019291 | United States | American Family Life Assurance Company of Columbus | | |
| 06161701 | Canada | Canada Life Assurance Company - The | | |
| 03592395 | United Kingdom | Canada Life | | |
| 09331694 | China | China Life (Overseas)^{A} | | |
| 09983114 | Bermuda | Chow Tai Fook Life Insurance^{A} | | |
| 09227603 | Canada | Desjardins Financial Security Life Assurance | | |
| 06334819 | Isle of Man | Friends Provident International | | |
| 09061605 | Bermuda | FWD Life Insurance Company (Bermuda)^{A} | | |
| 07531599 | Bermuda | HSBC Life (International)^{AB} | | |
| 00001111 | Canada | Manufacturers Life Insurance | | |
| 09760645 | Bermuda | Manulife (International)^{A} | | |
| F0003850 | United States | Massachusetts Mutual Life Insurance | | |
| 36410069 | United Kingdom | Phoenix Life | | |
| 03747637 | United States | Prudential Insurance Company of America | | |
| 18856710 | United States | RGA Reinsurance | | |
| 21903948 | Isle of Man | RL360 Insurance | | |
| 13989316 | Isle of Man | RL360 Life Insurance | | |
| 20771382 | United Kingdom | Scottish Widows | | |
| 10737079 | Bermuda | Sun Life Hong Kong^{A} | | |
| 13643566 | Bermuda | Tahoe Life Insurance | | |
| 36306777 | Bermuda | Transamerica Life (Bermuda)^{A} | | |
| 14185977 | Isle of Man | Utmost International Isle of Man^{A} | | |
| 08743329 | Guernsey | Utmost Worldwide | | |
| 13784095 | United Kingdom | Zurich Assurance | | |
| 10583149 | Isle of Man | Zurich International Life^{A} | | |
Composite business
| UBI | Country | Insurer | Established | Notes |
| 02420056 | Bermuda | AIA International^{A} | | |
| 06246715 | Italy | Assicurazioni Generali Società per Azioni | | |
| 06056536 | Bermuda | AXA China (Bermuda)^{A} | | |
| 11900235 | Germany | General Reinsurance AG^{R} | | |
| 22265733 | Germany | Hannover Rück SE^{R} | | |
| 20577651 | United Kingdom | Lloyd's | | |
| 09384841 | Germany | Münchener Rückversicherungs-Gesellschaft (Munich Reinsurance Company)^{R} | | |
| 58258136 | Italy | Partner Reinsurance Europe SE^{R} | | |
| 70045503 | Singapore | Swiss Re Asia Pte.^{R} | | |
General business
| UBI | Country | Insurer | Established | Notes |
| 59108554 | Germany | Allianz Global Corporate & Specialty SE | | |
| 50079233 | Bermuda | Allied World Assurance Company | | |
| 36962082 | China | Asia-Pacific Property & Casualty Insurance Co. | | |
| 37582853 | Norway | Assuranceforeningen Gard-gjensidig - | | |
| 61775290 | Norway | Assuranceforeningen SKULD (Gjensidig) | | |
| 66248260 | Spain | Atradius Crédito y Caución SA de Seguros y Reaseguros | | |
| 36380636 | United States | Berkley Insurance Company | | |
| 63706247 | United States | Berkshire Hathaway Specialty Insurance Company | | |
| 72265783 | Luxembourg | Britannia Steam Ship Insurance Association Europe | | |
| 22240389 | France | Compagnie Française d'Assurance pour le Commerce Extérieur | | |
| 62010590 | Belgium | EULER HERMES | | |
| 61007108 | United States | Factory Mutual Insurance Company | | |
| 31534286 | United States | First American Title Insurance Company | | |
| 39543231 | Bermuda | Gard Marine & Energy | | |
| 38244060 | Germany | HDI Global SE | | |
| 30173631 | United Kingdom | London Steam-Ship Owners' Mutual Insurance Association | | |
| 00062660 | India | New India Assurance Company | | |
| 03209857 | Philippines | Pioneer Insurance and Surety Corporation | | |
| 33313850 | Luxembourg | Shipowners' Mutual Protection and Indemnity Association (Luxembourg) - The | | |
| 69691141 | Singapore | Standard Club Asia | | |
| 66809591 | United Kingdom | Steamship Mutual Underwriting Association | | |
| 64650211 | Sweden | Sveriges Ångfartygs Assurans Förening | | |
| 65406895 | Luxembourg | Swiss Re International SE | | |
| 07332012 | Japan | Toa Reinsurance Company^{R} | | |
| 08832576 | United States | Transatlantic Reinsurance Company^{R} | | |
| 18974041 | United Kingdom | TT Club Mutual Insurance | | |
| 60245193 | United Kingdom | United Kingdom Mutual Steam Ship Assurance Association - The | | |
| F0002596 | Luxembourg | West of England Ship Owners Mutual Insurance Association (Luxembourg) | | |
| 21422728 | Ireland | XL Insurance Company SE | | |
| 06262864 | Switzerland | Zurich Insurance Company Ltd | | |

== Market share ==
Insurance regulators around the world — including the Insurance Authority (IA) in Hong Kong and the National Association of Insurance Commissioners (NAIC) in the United States — regularly publish premium income statistics. These figures are widely used to analyse market trends, assess the market position of individual insurers, and serve as key reference points for evaluating solvency and risk management practices.

=== Long term business ===
The following table is compiled based on the Provisional Statistics on Hong Kong Long Term Business published by the Insurance Authority. It aims to reflect the market performance of active participants in Hong Kong direct individual new business market. In accordance with international insurance statistical practices and to ensure cross-border data comparability, Gross Written Premiums (GWP) in these statistics exclude retirement scheme business that is purely of an asset management or administrative nature (such as Class G and H). Such business is treated as assets under management rather than insurance premiums involving biometric risks (e.g., mortality, longevity, or disability).

==== Gross premiums written ====
Direct inforce & group business as at the end of the period (2023 – 1H 2026)
| Rank | Insurer | 1H 2026 | | 2025 | | 2024 | | 2023 | |
| Rank | Insurer | GPW (HK$’000) | Share | GPW (HK$’000) | Share | GPW (HK$’000) | Share | GPW (HK$’000) | Share |
|---|---|---|---|---|---|---|---|---|---|
| 1 | HSBC Life (Int'l) | 90,328,566 | 18.68% | 88,292,934 | 13.19% | 59,561,484 | 11.87% | 53,916,203 | 11.90% |
| 2 | AIA International | 68,322,342 | 14.13% | 116,578,664 | 17.42% | 88,180,225 | 17.58% | 86,194,559 | 19.02% |
| 3 | Manulife (Int'l) | 63,887,395 | 13.21% | 67,485,791 | 10.08% | 49,570,969 | 9.88% | 44,438,885 | 9.81% |
| 4 | Prudential (HK) | 44,560,227 | 9.22% | 79,762,840 | 11.92% | 68,037,492 | 13.56% | 64,708,819 | 14.28% |
| 5 | BOC Life | 43,771,342 | 9.05% | 45,184,587 | 6.75% | 30,821,018 | 6.14% | 24,388,553 | 5.38% |
| 6 | FWD Life (Bermuda) | 30,768,308 | 6.36% | 37,978,233 | 5.67% | 25,226,259 | 5.03% | 18,754,290 | 4.14% |
| 7 | Sun Life Hong Kong | 27,535,517 | 5.69% | 35,564,427 | 5.31% | 20,085,546 | 4.00% | 12,483,000 | 2.75% |
| 8 | Hang Seng Insurance | 22,008,171 | 4.55% | 40,142,486 | 6.00% | 34,052,819 | 6.79% | 20,815,288 | 4.59% |
| 9 | China Life (Overseas) | 21,757,440 | 4.50% | 36,012,305 | 5.38% | 33,899,870 | 6.76% | 32,294,492 | 7.13% |
| 10 | AXA China (HK) | 18,747,319 | 3.88% | 33,527,716 | 5.01% | 25,040,507 | 4.99% | 24,603,823 | 5.43% |
| 11 | CTF Life | 10,704,314 | 2.21% | 17,010,785 | 2.54% | 13,477,172 | 2.69% | 23,304,379 | 5.14% |
| 12 | YF LIFE | 6,924,919 | 1.43% | 12,978,735 | 1.94% | 9,338,011 | 1.86% | 7,965,791 | 1.76% |
| 13 | Chubb Life HK | 6,398,557 | 1.32% | 7,554,201 | 1.13% | 4,742,926 | 0.95% | 4,076,760 | 0.90% |
| 14 | Well Link Life | 5,805,802 | 1.20% | 9,800,856 | 1.46% | 3,965,671 | 0.79% | 1,070,556 | 0.24% |
| 15 | TPLHK | 4,497,578 | 0.93% | 10,146,302 | 1.52% | 12,151,849 | 2.42% | 15,248,797 | 3.37% |
| 16 | CPIC Life (HK) | 3,844,119 | 0.80% | 2,820,049 | 0.42% | 1,329,064 | 0.26% | 209,188 | 0.05% |
| 17 | HKMC Annuity | 2,729,031 | 0.56% | 8,892,490 | 1.33% | 4,259,102 | 0.85% | 1,523,810 | 0.34% |
| 18 | Generali Life (HK) | 2,004,294 | 0.41% | 3,592,949 | 0.54% | 2,050,833 | 0.41% | 1,266,482 | 0.28% |
| 19 | Fubon Life Hong Kong | 1,735,288 | 0.36% | 2,145,929 | 0.32% | 1,773,647 | 0.35% | 2,397,545 | 0.53% |
| 20 | Zurich Life Insurance (Hong Kong) | 1,403,301 | 0.29% | 1,646,338 | 0.25% | 876,494 | 0.17% | 574,972 | 0.13% |
| 21 | Hong Kong Life | 1,372,887 | 0.28% | 1,752,342 | 0.26% | 1,104,486 | 0.22% | 865,699 | 0.19% |
| 22 | AXA CRI | 1,081,078 | 0.22% | 2,625,985 | 0.39% | 2,740,703 | 0.55% | 2,895,910 | 0.64% |
| 23 | Heng An Standard Life Asia | 752,392 | 0.16% | 1,017,058 | 0.15% | 803,954 | 0.16% | 685,737 | 0.15% |
| 24 | Zurich International | 324,618 | 0.07% | 981,063 | 0.15% | 1,047,434 | 0.21% | 1,167,497 | 0.26% |
| 25 | SJPI(HK) | 299,484 | 0.06% | 670,522 | 0.10% | 569,586 | 0.11% | 500,595 | 0.11% |
| 26 | FWD Life (HK) | 254,292 | 0.05% | 627,320 | 0.09% | 759,174 | 0.15% | 940,107 | 0.21% |
| 27 | TLIC | 227,219 | 0.05% | 591,583 | 0.09% | 817,538 | 0.16% | 1,044,213 | 0.23% |
| 28 | Bowtie Life | 218,329 | 0.05% | 420,296 | 0.06% | 281,846 | 0.06% | 163,940 | 0.04% |
| 29 | Manufacturers Life | 218,185 | 0.05% | 473,329 | 0.07% | 487,368 | 0.10% | 0 | - |
| 30 | Blue | 193,264 | 0.04% | 413,094 | 0.06% | 551,106 | 0.11% | 528,007 | 0.12% |
| 31 | AXA Wealth Mgt (HK) | 164,982 | 0.03% | 396,764 | 0.06% | 396,000 | 0.08% | 438,868 | 0.10% |
| 32 | Friends Provident Int'l | 159,489 | 0.03% | 338,698 | 0.05% | 414,311 | 0.08% | 459,607 | 0.10% |
| 33 | Utmost International Isle of Man | 147,820 | 0.03% | 346,076 | 0.05% | 781,683 | 0.16% | 563,917 | 0.12% |
| 34 | Transamerica Life (Bermuda) | 114,185 | 0.02% | 244,205 | 0.04% | 253,275 | 0.05% | 311,268 | 0.07% |
| 35 | AIA (HK) | 95,425 | 0.02% | 203,926 | 0.03% | 213,055 | 0.04% | 218,881 | 0.05% |
| 36 | Utmost Worldwide | 93,866 | 0.02% | 220,076 | 0.03% | 269,086 | 0.05% | 335,121 | 0.07% |
| 37 | Zurich Assurance | 64,060 | 0.01% | 141,568 | 0.02% | 156,150 | 0.03% | 176,372 | 0.04% |
| 38 | FWD Life Assurance | 17,830 | - | 45,929 | 0.01% | 57,353 | 0.01% | 73,562 | 0.02% |
| 39 | Canada Life Assurance | 16,404 | - | 123,097 | 0.02% | 123,236 | 0.02% | 112,716 | 0.02% |
| 40 | Pacific Life | 14,072 | - | 30,625 | - | 31,041 | 0.01% | 30,926 | 0.01% |
| 41 | AIA Everest | 12,248 | - | 200,211 | 0.03% | 748,581 | 0.15% | 838,442 | 0.19% |
| 42 | MyPace Life | 7,715 | - | | | | | | |
| 43 | Desjardins Financial Security | 6,434 | - | 18,512 | - | 19,249 | - | 19,809 | - |
| 44 | ZA Insure | 6,234 | - | 17,555 | - | 375,344 | 0.07% | 213,896 | 0.05% |
| 45 | Liberty Int'l | 4,490 | - | 44,824 | 0.01% | 46,606 | 0.01% | 53,489 | 0.01% |
| 46 | Massachusetts Mutual | 2,695 | - | 3,736 | - | 3,324 | - | 3,604 | - |
| 47 | Generali | 2,393 | - | 143,648 | 0.02% | 159,793 | 0.03% | 179,163 | 0.04% |
| 48 | HSBC Insurance | 1,528 | - | 3,338 | - | 3,941 | - | 4,735 | - |
| 49 | RL360 Services | 1,527 | - | 4,256 | - | 4,898 | - | 5,420 | - |
| 50 | RL360° | 190 | - | 554 | - | 869 | - | 1,119 | - |
| 51 | American Family Life | 151 | - | 367 | - | 389 | - | 415 | - |
| 52 | Prudential (America) | 51 | - | 225 | - | 54 | - | 0 | - |
| 53 | Scottish Widows | 35 | - | 90 | - | 127 | - | 237 | - |
| 54 | Asia Insurance | - | - | 31,382 | - | 34,428 | 0.01% | 37,824 | 0.01% |

==== Business development capabilities ====
Direct individual & group new business performance (2023 – 1H 2026)
| Rank | Insurer | 1H 2026 | | 2025 | | 2024 | | 2023 | |
| Rank | Insurer | GPW (HK$’000) | Share | GPW (HK$’000) | Share | GPW (HK$’000) | Share | GPW (HK$’000) | Share |
|---|---|---|---|---|---|---|---|---|---|
| 1 | HSBC Life (Int'l) | 68,784,535 | 25.00% | 51,395,865 | 15.53% | 36,845,725 | 16.77% | 34,130,803 | 18.86% |
| 2 | Manulife (Int'l) | 41,112,481 | 14.94% | 31,382,903 | 9.48% | 22,592,012 | 10.28% | 19,220,046 | 10.62% |
| 3 | AIA International | 27,542,284 | 10.01% | 44,738,744 | 13.52% | 27,611,483 | 12.56% | 24,447,289 | 13.51% |
| 4 | BOC Life | 25,677,094 | 9.33% | 26,063,886 | 7.88% | 17,383,516 | 7.91% | 11,700,250 | 6.47% |
| 5 | FWD Life (Bermuda) | 23,943,478 | 8.70% | 26,790,526 | 8.10% | 16,864,504 | 7.67% | 11,239,038 | 6.21% |
| 6 | Hang Seng Insurance | 17,714,962 | 6.44% | 33,344,012 | 10.09% | 25,255,769 | 11.49% | 13,551,800 | 7.49% |
| 7 | Sun Life Hong Kong | 17,388,396 | 6.32% | 21,000,304 | 6.35% | 11,020,466 | 5.01% | 6,336,420 | 3.50% |
| 8 | Prudential (HK) Life | 11,069,410 | 4.02% | 21,974,879 | 6.64% | 17,976,632 | 8.18% | 16,791,547 | 9.28% |
| 9 | China Life (Overseas) | 7,989,342 | 2.90% | 13,559,304 | 4.10% | 11,902,959 | 5.42% | 9,601,669 | 5.31% |
| 10 | Well Link Life | 5,727,453 | 2.08% | 9,697,823 | 2.93% | 3,902,231 | 1.78% | 963,836 | 0.53% |
| 11 | CTF Life | 5,192,331 | 1.89% | 6,923,906 | 2.09% | 5,204,815 | 2.37% | 16,160,970 | 8.93% |
| 12 | AXA China (HK) | 5,130,408 | 1.86% | 13,894,373 | 4.20% | 5,933,681 | 2.70% | 6,696,978 | 3.70% |
| 13 | Chubb Life HK | 4,238,836 | 1.54% | 3,919,362 | 1.18% | 1,587,527 | 0.72% | 763,884 | 0.42% |
| 14 | HKMC Annuity | 2,739,031 | 1.00% | 8,892,490 | 2.69% | 4,259,102 | 1.94% | 1,523,810 | 0.84% |
| 15 | CPIC Life (HK) | 2,500,848 | 0.91% | 1,694,370 | 0.51% | 1,034,652 | 0.47% | 183,136 | 0.10% |
| 16 | TPLHK | 1,901,374 | 0.69% | 3,766,323 | 1.14% | 2,541,965 | 1.16% | 1,677,040 | 0.93% |
| 17 | YF LIFE | 1,641,251 | 0.60% | 5,154,934 | 1.56% | 2,825,097 | 1.29% | 2,554,526 | 1.41% |
| 18 | Zurich Life Insurance (Hong Kong) | 1,071,448 | 0.39% | 1,126,068 | 0.34% | 458,207 | 0.21% | 231,297 | 0.13% |
| 19 | Fubon Life Hong Kong | 1,000,507 | 0.36% | 964,261 | 0.29% | 822,923 | 0.37% | 630,874 | 0.35% |
| 20 | Hong Kong Life | 884,950 | 0.32% | 1,036,473 | 0.31% | 546,781 | 0.25% | 267,823 | 0.15% |
| 21 | Heng An Standard Life Asia | 598,663 | 0.22% | 726,225 | 0.22% | 490,412 | 0.22% | 321,608 | 0.18% |
| 22 | Generali Life (HK) | 554,258 | 0.20% | 2,064,386 | 0.62% | 977,487 | 0.44% | 672,548 | 0.37% |
| 23 | Blue | 106,901 | 0.04% | 123,803 | 0.04% | 428,148 | 0.19% | 391,207 | 0.22% |
| 24 | Utmost International Isle of Man | 88,643 | 0.03% | 133,497 | 0.04% | 487,611 | 0.22% | 320,745 | 0.18% |
| 25 | Bowtie Life | 81,244 | 0.03% | 171,205 | 0.05% | 131,128 | 0.06% | 89,305 | 0.05% |
| 26 | SJPI(HK) | 79,249 | 0.03% | 331,990 | 0.10% | 245,416 | 0.11% | 243,967 | 0.13% |
| 27 | Zurich International | 13,105 | 0.00% | 30,257 | 0.01% | 22,417 | 0.01% | 15,406 | 0.01% |
| 28 | Transamerica Life (Bermuda) | 7,617 | 0.00% | 4,836 | 0.00% | 15,276 | 0.01% | 8,292 | 0.00% |
| 29 | AXA CRI | 4,944 | 0.00% | 3,286 | 0.00% | 3,935 | 0.00% | 3,153 | 0.00% |
| 30 | Generali | 4,067 | 0.00% | 1,445 | 0.00% | 259 | 0.00% | 4,565 | 0.00% |
| 31 | Asia Insurance | 952 | 0.00% | 2,925 | 0.00% | 2,239 | 0.00% | 2,528 | 0.00% |
| 32 | ZA Insure | 641 | 0.00% | 2,153 | 0.00% | 360,123 | 0.16% | 199,018 | 0.11% |
| 33 | Liberty Int'l | 614 | 0.00% | 1,100 | 0.00% | 1,128 | 0.00% | 589 | 0.00% |
| 34 | Pacific Life | 474 | 0.00% | 1,361 | 0.00% | 1,010 | 0.00% | 934 | 0.00% |

=== General business ===
The following is compiled based on direct business data from the Provisional Statistics on Hong Kong General Business published by the Insurance Authority of Hong Kong. The table aims to reflect the market performance of active participants in Hong Kong general business market.

Direct business performance of general business (2024–2025)
| Rank | Insurer | 2025 | | 2024 | |
| Rank | Insurer | GPW (HK$’000) | Share | GPW (HK$’000) | Share |
|---|---|---|---|---|---|
| 1 | AXA General | 5,465,561 | 9.97% | 5,267,861 | 10.25% |
| 2 | Bupa (Asia) | 4,661,857 | 8.51% | 4,187,746 | 8.14% |
| 3 | AIA International | 4,246,926 | 7.75% | 3,363,891 | 6.54% |
| 4 | Zurich Insurance | 3,084,913 | 5.63% | 2,993,871 | 5.82% |
| 5 | CTPI(HK) | 2,509,119 | 4.58% | 2,605,935 | 5.07% |
| 6 | CIGNA Worldwide General | 2,118,720 | 3.87% | 1,912,950 | 3.72% |
| 7 | BOC Group Insurance | 2,027,154 | 3.70% | 1,974,285 | 3.84% |
| 8 | Blue Cross | 1,889,140 | 3.45% | 1,654,242 | 3.22% |
| 9 | Chubb Insurance | 1,718,429 | 3.14% | 1,744,392 | 3.39% |
| 10 | AIG Insurance HK | 1,570,765 | 2.87% | 1,645,017 | 3.20% |
| 11 | Liberty Int'l | 1,550,070 | 2.83% | 1,588,158 | 3.09% |
| 12 | Prudential (HK) General | 1,362,182 | 2.49% | 1,307,846 | 2.54% |
| 13 | Asia Insurance | 1,335,413 | 2.44% | 1,389,165 | 2.70% |
| 14 | AXA China (HK) | 1,324,970 | 2.42% | 1,246,071 | 2.42% |
| 15 | QBE HKSI | 1,199,960 | 2.19% | 1,118,915 | 2.18% |
| 16 | AGCS SE | 1,153,560 | 2.10% | 1,148,368 | 2.23% |
| 17 | MSIG Insurance | 1,121,010 | 2.05% | 1,126,892 | 2.19% |
| 18 | CMBWL | 1,052,635 | 1.92% | 1,118,189 | 2.17% |
| 19 | Dah Sing Insurance | 920,589 | 1.68% | 828,680 | 1.61% |
| 20 | Generali | 838,163 | 1.53% | 795,601 | 1.55% |
| 21 | Allied World | 762,810 | 1.39% | 796,998 | 1.55% |
| 22 | HKMCI | 753,452 | 1.37% | 988,284 | 1.92% |
| 23 | AIA (HK) | 712,036 | 1.30% | 690,814 | 1.34% |
| 24 | Sun Hung Kai | 685,533 | 1.25% | 302,446 | 0.59% |
| 25 | bolttech Insurance | 540,547 | 0.99% | 527,779 | 1.03% |
| 26 | | 510,261 | 0.93% | - | - |
| 27 | Gard P&I | 472,811 | 0.86% | 437,715 | 0.85% |
| 28 | BHSI | 466,403 | 0.85% | 508,789 | 0.99% |
| 29 | Skuld | 439,985 | 0.80% | 388,011 | 0.75% |
| 30 | China Ping An | 435,579 | 0.79% | 452,273 | 0.88% |
| 31 | AXA China (Bermuda) | 415,791 | 0.76% | 372,737 | 0.72% |
| 32 | Lloyd's | 415,569 | 0.76% | 327,359 | 0.64% |
| 33 | Chevalier | 411,030 | 0.75% | 291,399 | 0.57% |
| 34 | XL Insurance | 385,955 | 0.70% | 410,218 | 0.80% |
| 35 | Starr | 372,242 | 0.68% | 383,350 | 0.75% |
| 36 | PICC (HK) | 349,258 | 0.64% | 284,521 | 0.55% |
| 37 | TMF (HK) | 336,108 | 0.61% | 354,635 | 0.69% |
| 38 | China Pacific | 333,515 | 0.61% | 321,353 | 0.63% |
| 39 | OneDegree | 329,992 | 0.60% | 241,197 | 0.47% |
| 40 | LSMHK | 322,000 | 0.59% | 268,408 | 0.52% |
| 41 | Falcon Insurance | 312,909 | 0.57% | 313,230 | 0.61% |
| 42 | SIL | 310,566 | 0.57% | 302,092 | 0.59% |
| 43 | EULER HERMES | 256,125 | 0.47% | 243,621 | 0.47% |
| 44 | Hong Leong Insurance (Asia) | 252,302 | 0.46% | 96,931 | 0.19% |
| 45 | China Overseas Insurance | 206,220 | 0.38% | 134,868 | 0.26% |
| 46 | TT Club | 204,430 | 0.37% | 190,741 | 0.37% |
| 47 | Factory Mutual | 196,864 | 0.36% | 242,333 | 0.47% |
| 48 | Sompo Insurance (HK) | 186,496 | 0.34% | 273,010 | 0.53% |
| 49 | STEAMSHIP MUTUAL | 182,165 | 0.33% | 128,599 | 0.25% |
| 50 | Pacific Insurance | 148,954 | 0.27% | 147,091 | 0.29% |
| 51 | Min Xin | 142,516 | 0.26% | 151,968 | 0.30% |
| 52 | West of England | 132,941 | 0.24% | 137,293 | 0.27% |
| 53 | China BOCOM | 132,833 | 0.24% | 135,449 | 0.26% |
| 54 | Trinity | 125,466 | 0.23% | 136,098 | 0.26% |
| 55 | Berkley Insurance | 124,016 | 0.23% | 134,091 | 0.26% |
| 56 | ACyC | 122,678 | 0.22% | 118,309 | 0.23% |
| 57 | COFACE | 104,512 | 0.19% | 75,727 | 0.15% |
| 58 | QBE MI Asia | 97,507 | 0.18% | 30,613 | 0.06% |
| 59 | Concord | 87,494 | 0.16% | 96,349 | 0.19% |
| 60 | Standard Club Asia | 86,100 | 0.16% | 69,930 | 0.14% |
| 61 | Swiss Re Int'l SE | 83,797 | 0.15% | 110,638 | 0.22% |
| 62 | Paofoong | 83,331 | 0.15% | 80,558 | 0.16% |
| 63 | United Builders | 80,390 | 0.15% | 81,810 | 0.16% |
| 64 | Well Link Insurance | 75,958 | 0.14% | 125,718 | 0.24% |
| 65 | Britannia Europe P&I | 74,206 | 0.14% | 73,536 | 0.14% |
| 66 | Gard M&E Ltd. | 72,319 | 0.13% | 58,113 | 0.11% |
| 67 | ABCI | 63,482 | 0.12% | 53,726 | 0.10% |
| 68 | Shipowners' Mutual | 63,160 | 0.12% | 63,707 | 0.12% |
| 69 | HDI | 52,484 | 0.10% | 49,176 | 0.10% |
| 70 | California Insurance | 46,156 | 0.08% | 46,985 | 0.09% |
| 71 | Chong Hing | 29,694 | 0.05% | 27,257 | 0.05% |
| 72 | UK P&I Club | 26,708 | 0.05% | 35,907 | 0.07% |
| 73 | ASIA-PACIFIC P&C | 20,877 | 0.04% | 26,013 | 0.05% |
| 74 | Avo Insurance | 16,614 | 0.03% | 5,797 | 0.01% |
| 75 | Tugu | 5,112 | 0.01% | 15,819 | 0.03% |
| 76 | CNOOC Insurance | 1,123 | 0.00% | 842 | 0.00% |
| 77 | Pioneer | 38 | 0.00% | 19,153 | 0.04% |
| 78 | Target | 23 | 0.00% | -661 | 0.00% |
| 79 | London Steam-Ship | -5,510 | -0.01% | 16,523 | 0.03% |

== See also ==
- List of banks in Hong Kong
- List of pension schemes in Hong Kong
- List of insurance companies in Macau
