= British Insurance Services =

- Company type: Trading Style
- Industry: Financial services
- Founded: 2003; 23 years ago
- Headquarters: Southport, Merseyside, England
- Key people: Gary Duggan, CEO Paymentshield Limited
- Products: Insurance
- Parent: Towergate Partnership
- Website: www.britishinsurance.com

British Insurance Services is an insurance provider based in Southport, Merseyside, offering payment protection insurance and home insurance. The company is an online-only insurance provider which sells its policies independently of loan providers. It is a subsidiary of Towergate Underwriting Group Limited, and had gross written premiums of around £12 million as of 2012.

== History ==
The company was set up in 2003 by husband and wife Simon and Sara Burgess, under the name Burgesses. It changed its name to British Insurance in 2005, after gaining permission from the then Secretary of State for Industry to use the word 'British' in the company title.

In 2006 the company was reported to be insuring three sisters from Inverness, Scotland, against the possibility of a virgin birth. It had provided a £1 million policy to cover the cost of child-raising in the event of one of them giving birth to the Second Coming of Christ. The company told BBC News Online that it had been donating the premiums of £100 per year to charity. It withdrew the policy in 2006 following complaints; Burgess said that the Catholic Church was "up in arms about what we've been doing". The company also insured a football fan for £1 million against suffering severe mental trauma if England were knocked out of the 2006 World Cup prematurely.

British Insurance was acquired by Towergate in 2008 for an estimated £25 million. Existing staff, including the founders, were retained as part of the deal. Simon Burgess continued as managing director until 2010. Following his departure, Nel Mooy was appointed as managing director.

In 2013, the business was transferred within the Towergate Group and is now a trading style of Southport-based income protection and household insurance provider Paymentshield Limited.

== Awards ==
The company's awards include:

=== 2011 ===
- The Money Awards: Outstanding Achievement Award.

=== 2010 ===
- Personal Finance: Outstanding Online Insurance Provider.
- Mortgage Finance Gazette: Best Overall Insurance Provider and Ambassador Award

=== 2009 ===
- Mortgage Finance Gazette: Excellence in Treating Customers Fairly (financial service product provider category)
- Investment International: Best Mortgage Payment Protection Insurance Provider
- What Mortgage: Best Online Insurance Provider
- Investment International: Best Overall Insurance Provider
- Global Business Excellence: Outstanding Consumer Champion (Simon Burgess)
