= List of insurance companies in Macau =

According to data disclosed by the Monetary Authority of Macao, as of the first quarter of 2025, there were a total of 27 licensed insurance companies in Macau. All 13 life insurance companies were active in the life insurance market (including medical, critical illness, life, savings, and investment-linked life products).

== Insurance companies ==
=== Incorporated in Macau ===
According to the Monetary Authority of Macao, as of 9 January 2025, there were a total of 11 locally incorporated insurance companies in Macau, comprising 5 life insurance companies and 6 general insurance companies.

Regulated insurer incorporated in Macau
B: Bancassurance – the insurer distributes products primarily through banking channels.
Life Insurers
No	Insurer	Established	Notes
1	Companhia de Seguros de Vida Tahoe (Macau)		
2	Fidelidade Macau Vida - Companhia de Seguros^{B}		
3	Seguradora Vida FWD (Macau)		
4	Companhia de Seguros Luen Fung Hang-Vida^{B}		
5	Companhia de Seguros Vida China Taiping (Macau)		
General Insurers
No	Insurer	Established	Notes
6	Companhia de Seguros da China Taiping (Macau)		
7	Companhia de Seguros Luen Fung Hang^{B}		
8	Companhia de Seguros de Macau^{B}		
9	Companhia de Seguros Delta Ásia^{B}		
10	Chubb Seguradora Macau		
11	Fidelidade Macau- Companhia de Seguros^{B}		

=== Incorporated outside Macau ===
According to the Monetary Authority of Macao, as of 9 January 2025, there were a total of 16 foreign-incorporated insurance companies operating in Macau, comprising 8 life insurance companies and 8 general insurance companies.

Regulated insurer incorporated outside Macau
B: Bancassurance – the insurer distributes products primarily through banking channels.
Life Insurers
No	Headquarters	Insurer	Established	Notes
1	Bermuda	AIA International		
2	China	China Life Insurance (Overseas)		
3	Canada	The Canada Life Assurance		
4	Bermuda	AXA China Region Insurance Company (Bermuda)		
5	Hong Kong	Manulife (International)		
6	Hong Kong	YF Life Insurance International		
7	Bermuda	HSBC Life (International)^{B}		
8	Hong Kong	Prudential Hong Kong		
General Insurers
No	Headquarters	Insurer	Established	Notes
9	Hong Kong	AIG Insurance Hong Kong		
10	Hong Kong	Asia Insurance		
11	Hong Kong	MSIG Insurance (Hong Kong)		
12	Hong Kong	Min Xin Insurance		
13	United States	Berkshire Hathaway Specialty Insurance		
14	Hong Kong	AXA Seguros Gerais Hong Kong		
15	Hong Kong	Companhia de Seguros Popular da China (Hong Kong)		
16	Hong Kong	QBE Hongkong & Shanghai Seguros		

== Market share ==
=== Life insurance ===
The following table is compiled based on the “Insurance Activity - Quarterly Reports (Provisional Statistics)” published by the Monetary Authority of Macao. It is intended to reflect the market performance of active participants in Macau life insurance market.

Market performance of the Life Insurance business (2023 – Q1 2025)
Rank	Insurer	Q1 2025		2024		2023	
Rank	Insurer	GPW (MOP$’000)	Share	GPW (MOP$’000)	Share	GPW (MOP$’000)	Share
1	China Life (Overseas) Macau Branch	3,393,844	32.96%	13,341,176	37.05%	10,826,820	31.64%
2	AIA International Macau Branch	2,144,082	20.82%	9,407,257	26.13%	9,236,725	27.00%
3	Companhia de Seguros Vida China Taiping (Macau)	1,850,291	17.97%	3,715,686	10.32%	3,327,084	9.72%
4	YF Life Insurance International Macau Branch	926,018	8.99%	3,121,877	8.67%	4,063,546	11.88%
5	AXA China Region Insurance Company (Bermuda) Macau Branch	697,463	6.77%	2,466,874	6.85%	2,361,592	6.90%
6	Manulife (International) Macau Branch	562,614	5.46%	2,095,450	5.82%	2,058,209	6.02%
7	Seguradora Vida FWD (Macau)	428,490	4.16%	936,795	2.60%	1,516,738	4.43%
8	Fidelidade Macau Vida - Companhia de Seguros	155,537	1.51%	491,480	1.36%	476,198	1.39%
9	Companhia de Seguros Luen Fung Hang-Vida	67,990	0.66%	196,919	0.55%	194,948	0.57%
10	HSBC Life (International) Macau Branch	63,658	0.62%	206,729	0.57%	116,783	0.34%
11	Companhia de Seguros de Vida Tahoe (Macau)	3,160	0.03%	20,538	0.06%	32,899	0.10%
12	Prudential Hong Kong Macau Branch	1,846	0.02%	3,055	0.01%	327	0.00%
13	The Canada Life Assurance Macau Branch	729	0.01%	2,290	0.01%	2,157	0.01%

=== General insurance ===
The following table is compiled based on the “Insurance Activity - Quarterly Reports (Provisional Statistics)” published by the Monetary Authority of Macao. It is intended to reflect the market performance of active participants in Macau general insurance market.

Market performance of the General Insurance business (2023 – Q1 2025)
Rank	Insurer	Q1 2025		2024		2023	
Rank	Insurer	GPW (MOP$’000)	Share	GPW (MOP$’000)	Share	GPW (MOP$’000)	Share
1	China Taiping (Macau)	345,825	40.00%	963,586	32.90%	944,265	33.16%
2	Luen Fung Hang	212,477	24.57%	609,174	20.80%	608,774	21.38%
3	Asia Insurance Macau Branch	90,472	10.46%	258,843	8.84%	256,428	9.01%
4	Companhia de Seguros de Macau	67,361	7.79%	339,434	11.59%	255,004	8.96%
5	Fidelidade Macau- Companhia de Seguros	48,353	5.59%	146,591	5.00%	190,937	6.71%
6	MSIG Macau Branch	23,730	2.74%	157,352	5.37%	156,255	5.49%
7	Min Xin Macau Branch	23,672	2.74%	120,349	4.11%	124,263	4.36%
8	AIG Macau Branch	18,319	2.12%	103,960	3.55%	94,475	3.32%
9	Chubb	13,569	1.57%	63,180	2.16%	55,392	1.95%
10	QBE Macau Branch	8,320	0.96%	74,625	2.55%	64,405	2.26%
11	Companhia de Seguros Delta Ásia	6,508	0.75%	20,210	0.69%	20,293	0.71%
12	Popular da China (Hong Kong) Macau Branch	4,753	0.55%	11,466	0.39%	17,144	0.60%
13	AXA Macau Branch	788	0.09%	55,373	1.89%	54,164	1.90%
14	Berkshire Hathaway Macau Branch	464	0.05%	4,957	0.17%	5,726	0.20%

== See also ==
- List of banks in Macau
- List of insurance companies in Hong Kong
