= Pacific Prime =

Hong Kong based global health insurance

- Type: Private
- Industry: Insurance; Employee benefits
- Founded: 2000; 26 years ago in Hong Kong
- Founders: Neil Raymond
- Headquarters: Hong Kong
- Area served: Worldwide
- Key people: Neil Raymond (CEO)
- Products: Pacific Prime Flex Portal
- Services: Health insurance brokerage Employee benefits administration Corporate insurance Risk consulting
- Number of employees: 1,000+ (2025)
- Website: pacificprime.com

Pacific Prime is an insurance brokerage specializing in health insurance for expatriates, multinational corporations, and employee benefits solutions. It is headquartered in Hong Kong with over 15 offices worldwide.

Pacific Prime services include employee benefits, risk management, international private medical insurance (IPMI), and car insurance. It is one of the world's largest providers of insurance with over US$1 billion in premiums under management in total.

== History ==
Pacific Prime was founded in 2000 in Hong Kong by Neil Raymond. In 2003, Pacific Prime opened its first office outside Hong Kong in Shanghai, followed by a Singapore office in 2006. Pacific Prime expanded into the Middle East in 2010. Later, Pacific Prime opened an office in Dubai and launched an online quotation platform for comparing insurance plans.

Pacific Prime continued expanding with offices in Beijing in 2016, Bangkok in 2017, London in 2018, Mexico City in 2019, and Cebu in 2020. In 2017, Pacific Prime joined the World Broker Network (WBN), gaining access to a global network of independent brokers.

In February 2021, Pacific Prime acquired the Hong Kong and Singapore brokerage operations of Singapore-based insurtech firm CXA Group. The acquisition made Pacific Prime the third-largest employee benefits broker in the Asia-Pacific region following the Aon–WTW and Mercer–JLT mergers. Later that year, the company opened an office in Jakarta.

In February 2024, Pacific Prime acquired Malaysia-based MIT Insurance Brokers Sdn Bhd, a brokerage firm specializing in risk management, insurance, and reinsurance. Following the acquisition, MIT Insurance Brokers became part of Pacific Prime Consultants Malaysia.

== Operations ==
Pacific Prime operates as an insurance intermediary working with more than 60 international insurers, including AXA, Bupa, and Cigna. Its services include individual and corporate health insurance, group life insurance, employee benefits administration, property and casualty coverage, and risk consulting for multinational corporations, international schools, and expatriates.

As of 2025, Pacific Prime manages approximately $1 billion in premiums and operates offices in Hong Kong, Shanghai, Beijing, Guangzhou, Shenzhen, Singapore, Dubai, Bangkok, London, Los Angeles, Mexico City, Cebu, Kuala Lumpur, Jakarta, and Melbourne. The company also operates Kwiksure, an online insurance brokerage registered with the Insurance Authority of Hong Kong.

Pacific Prime's Flex Portal, developed from the CXA Group acquisition, is a flexible employee benefits management platform that supports plan administration, employee engagement, and benefits analytics for corporate clients across multiple jurisdictions.
