= Well Link Financial Group =

Hong Kong financial services group

- Native name: 立橋金融集團
- Company type: Private
- Industry: Financial Services
- Founded: 2005; 21 years ago in Hong Kong
- Headquarters: Hong Kong
- Area served: Hong Kong, Macau, Mainland China
- Key people: Choy Chung Foo (Chairman); Zhang Shengman (CEO)
- Products: Banking, Insurance, Securities Brokerage
- Subsidiaries: Well Link Bank; Well Link Insurance Group; Well Link Securities（SEHK: 8350）
- Website: www.welllinkgroup.com

Well Link Financial Group
- Traditional Chinese: 立橋金融集團
- Simplified Chinese: 立桥金融集团
Transcriptions
Standard Mandarin
- Hanyu Pinyin: Lìqiáo Jīnróng Jítuán
Yue: Cantonese
- Jyutping: lap6 kiu4 gam1 jung4 zaap6 tyun4

Well Link Financial Group (Chinese: 立橋金融集團; pinyin: lap6 kiu4 gam1 jung4 zaap6 tyun4) is a Hong Kong-headquartered financial institution whose business covers banking, insurance, and securities services.

== History ==
In November 2005, Well Link Securities was granted a Type 1 license (Dealing in Securities) by the Securities and Futures Commission (SFC) of Hong Kong, launching its Hong Kong stock brokerage business. This is regarded as the origin of Well Link.

In September 2009, Well Link Securities obtained a Type 2 license (Dealing in Futures Contracts), adding brokerage services for futures and options.

In August 2016, Well Link Financial Group acquired Direct Asia (Hong Kong) Limited, which was subsequently renamed Well Link General Insurance Company Limited in June 2017.

In April 2017, Well Link Financial Group acquired Novo Banco Asia, which was subsequently renamed "Well Link Bank" (Well Link Bank Co., Ltd.).

In April 2019, Well Link Life received approval from the Insurance Authority to operate a long-term life insurance business, and officially launched in July 2019.

In 2020, the Well Link Financial Centre was completed in the Qianhai, Shenzhen. Jointly developed by Well Link Financial Group and Zhaobangji Properties, the project is a Grade A office complex with a total construction area of approximately 160,000 square meters. It also includes a shopping mall named Well Link City.

In November 2023, Well Link Fintech completed the acquisition of approximately 69.94% of the issued share capital of Excalibur Global Financial Holdings Limited (8350.HK).

in May 2025, Well Link Securities Holdings announced the acquisition of all issued shares of Haishan Company Limited (海山股份有限公司) for HK$35 million. The acquisition was officially completed in October of that same year.

== Structure ==
Well Link Financial Group maintains wholly-owned or majority-controlled subsidiaries covering the banking, insurance, and securities sectors:

Company Name	Business Nature	Year of Establishment / Acquisition	Remarks
Well Link Bank	Commercial Bank	1996	Former Novo Banco; A fully licensed commercial bank registered in Macau
Well Link Life Insurance Company Limited	Life insurance	2019	Long-term insurance business
Well Link General Insurance Company Limited	General insurance	2016	Former Direct Asia (Hong Kong) Limited
Well Link Securities	Securities Brokerage	2016	listed on the GEM of the Hong Kong Stock Exchange（SEHK: 8350）

== See also ==
- Well Link Insurance Group
- Well Link Bank
