= Well Link Bank =

Well Link Bank Co., Ltd.

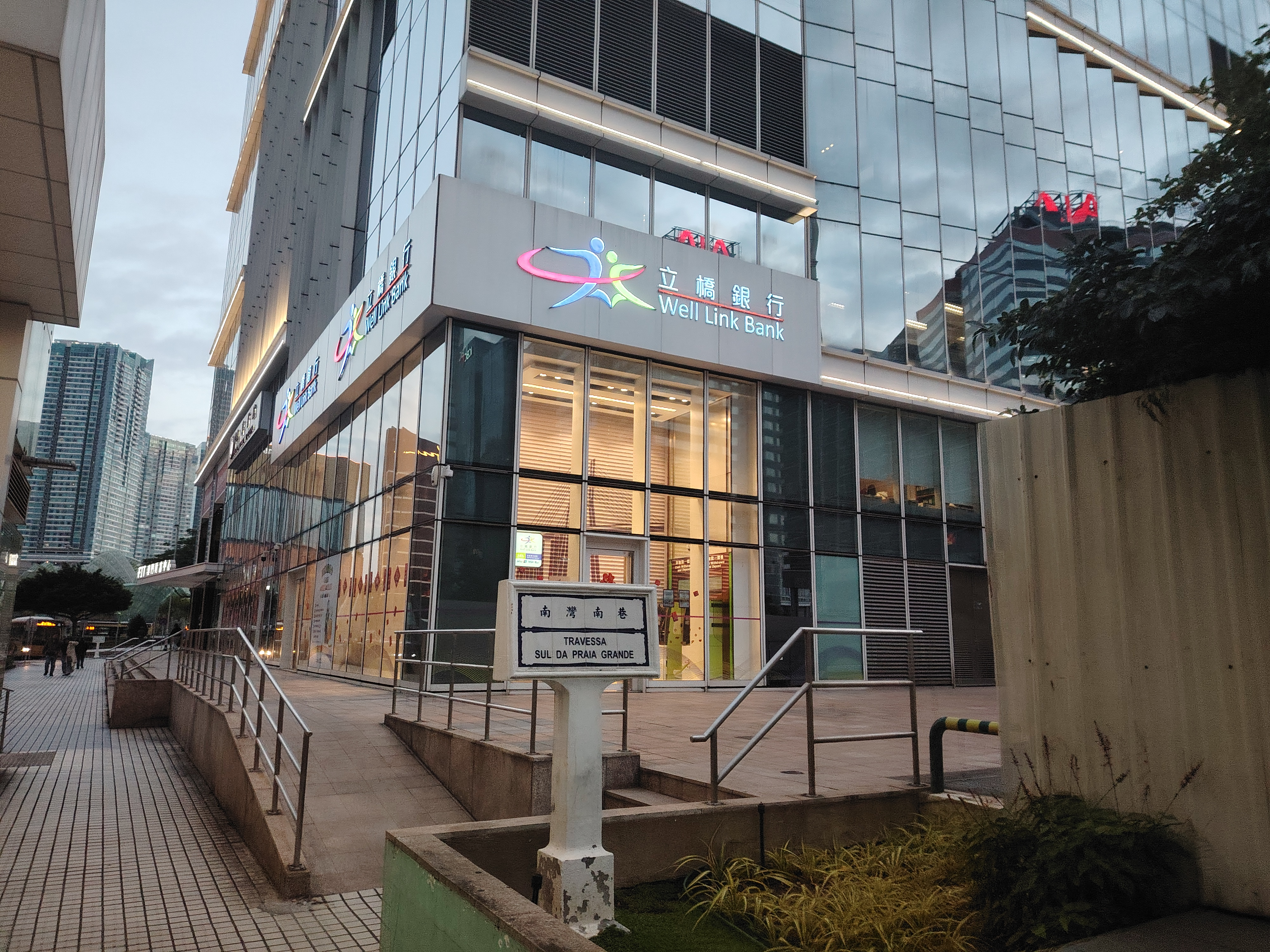
- Native name: 立橋銀行股份有限公司
- Type: Subsidiary
- Industry: Banking, Financial services
- Founded: 1996; 30 years ago
- Headquarters: Macau
- Key people: Zhang Sheng Man (Chairman); Huang Ruisheng (CEO)
- Products: Retail banking, Commercial banking
- Operating income: ▲MOP308.5 million (2025)
- Net income: ▲MOP270.5 million (2025)
- Total assets: ▲MOP47.7 billion (June 2026)
- Parent: Well Link Financial Group
- Website: wlbank.com.mo

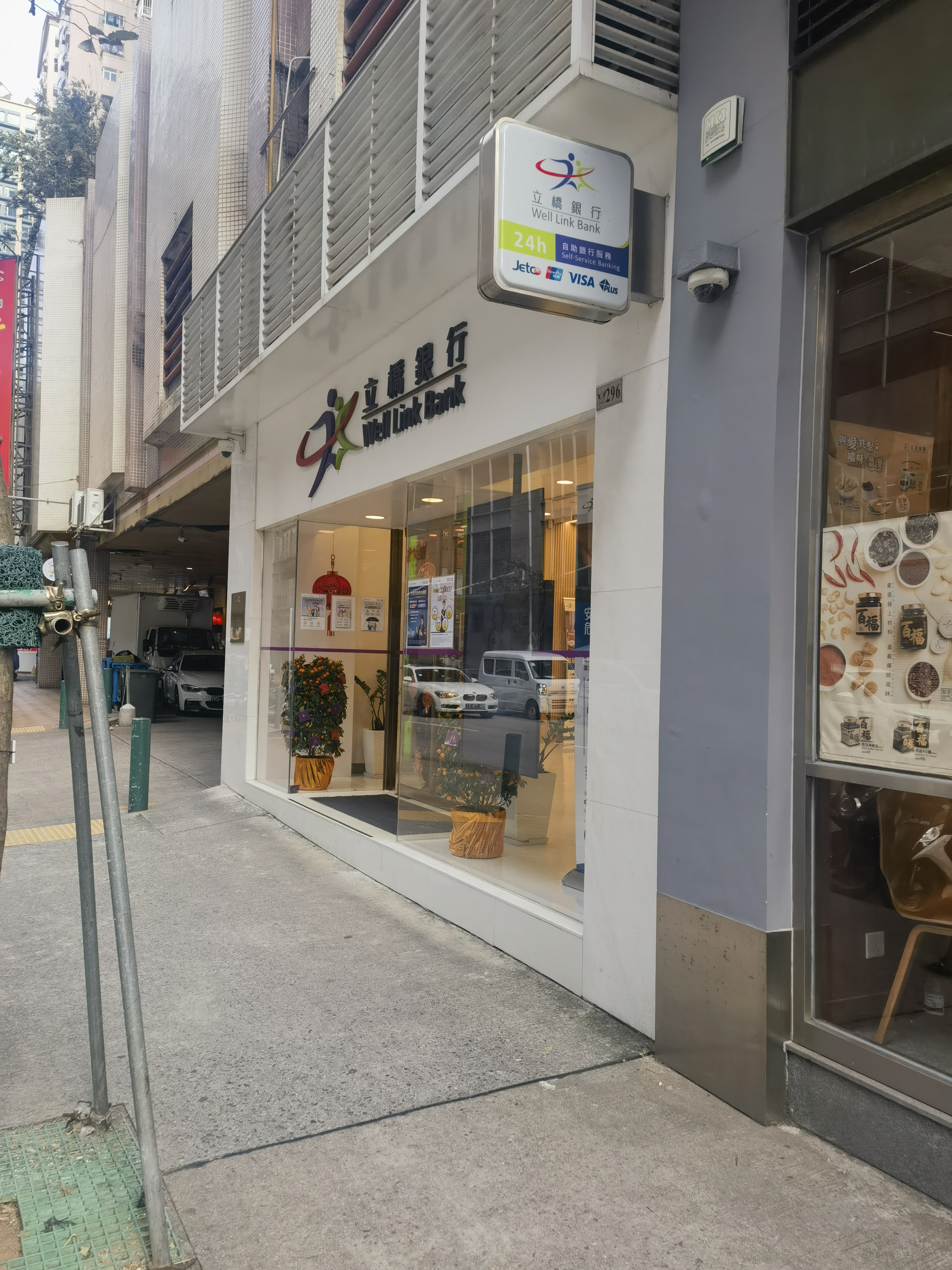
Well Link Bank Taipa Flower City Branch

Well Link Bank
- Traditional Chinese: 立橋銀行
- Simplified Chinese: 立桥银行
Transcriptions
Standard Mandarin
- Hanyu Pinyin: Lìqiáo Yínháng
Yue: Cantonese
- Jyutping: lap6 kiu4 ngan4 hong4

Well Link Bank Co., Ltd. (Chinese: 立橋銀行股份有限公司; Portuguese: Banco Well Link, S.A；commonly refer as Well Link Bank) is a fully licensed commercial bank in Macau. Founded in 1996, it was acquired by the Hong Kong-based Well Link Financial Group in April 2017 and subsequently changed to its current name. Currently operating seven branches in Macau, it is the only bank in the region that provides services 365 days a year.

As of June 2026, Well Link Bank is the 10th largest bank in Macau, with total assets of 47.73 billion MOP.

== History ==
In 1996, the Portuguese bank Banco Espírito Santo established Banco Espírito Santo do Oriente, S.A. in Macau to engage in wholesale banking, serving as its sole branch in the Far East. In 2014, following a crisis and subsequent bankruptcy of Banco Espírito Santo, the Portuguese government created Novo Banco to take over the majority of its operations; consequently, Banco Espírito Santo do Oriente was renamed Novo Banco Asia.

In April 2017, a consortium led by Well Link Financial Group acquired the unit from Portugal's Novo Banco for MOP 1.5 billion (approximately EUR 175 million). The bank was officially renamed Well Link Bank in October of the same year.

In July 2018, the first branch, Nape Branch, was established.

In 2019, the bank rapidly expanded its branch network, establishing its first branch in Taipa to reach its current scale. During the same period, it also began issuing UnionPay and Visa credit cards.

In January 2026, the China Securities Regulatory Commission (CSRC) approved Well Link Bank's qualification as a Qualified Foreign Institutional Investor (QFI).

== See also ==
- Monetary Authority of Macao
- Well Link Financial Group
- Well Link Insurance Group
