= North China Daily News Building =

Office building in Shanghai, China

Coordinates: 31°14′17″N 121°29′23″E

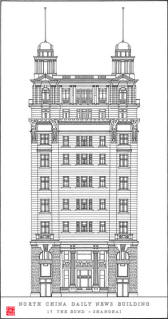
North China Daily News Building – The Bund – Shanghai (Elevation)

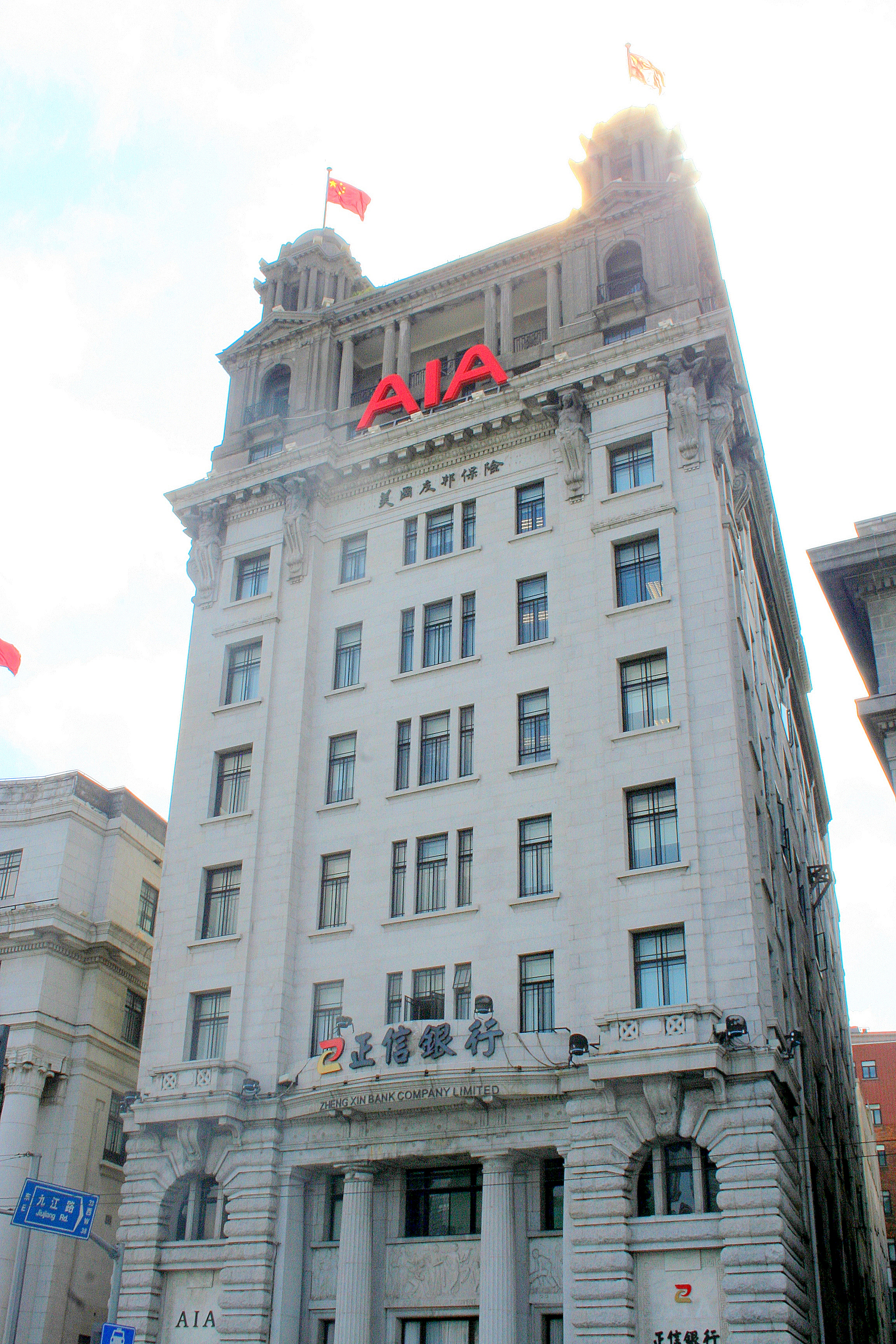
The North China Daily News Building is currently occupied by an American insurance company, AIA.

The North China Daily News Building (simplified Chinese: 字林大楼; traditional Chinese: 字林大樓; pinyin: Zìlín Dàlóu) is a historical Neo-Renaissance-style office building on the Bund in Shanghai, China located at No.17, The Bund. It currently houses the offices of the American International Assurance (AIA), and is thus often called the AIA Building (友邦大廈; Yǒubāng Dàshà). At the time of its opening in 1924, it was the tallest building in Shanghai.

== History ==
The North China Daily News was the first English-language newspaper to be published in Shanghai, in 1850. Because the newspaper's founder saw Shanghai as a growing commercial center and founded the paper to support Shanghai's growth, much of its original content was related to shipping news. The paper expanded as Shanghai grew, and moved to the Bund in 1901. In 1921 the paper began construction of this building as its new headquarters, and completed construction in 1924.

The building was designed by architects Lester, Johnson & Morriss, which was co-founded by Gordon Morriss, the brother of the newspaper's owner at the time, Henry E. Morriss. From 1927 the building also housed the offices of American Asiatic Underwriters, an insurance agency founded by Cornelius Vander Starr and the forerunner of the American International Group (AIG). The Japanese Empire confiscated the building during its occupation of Shanghai during the World War II. During that time the building was home to the Tairiku Shimpō (大陸新報), a Japanese newspaper.

After World War II the North China Daily News returned to the building, and the paper continued to operate until 1951, shortly after the founding of the People's Republic of China. The building was then confiscated and used by the Chinese government as a branch for various government offices at various times. In 1996 the building was restored by Jan Hird Pokorny Associates of New York City, and in 1998 it became the Shanghai branch of AIA Group Limited. AIA was a subsidiary of American International Group (AIG), which is a successor company of the American Asiatic Underwriters, who occupied part of the building in the early twentieth century.

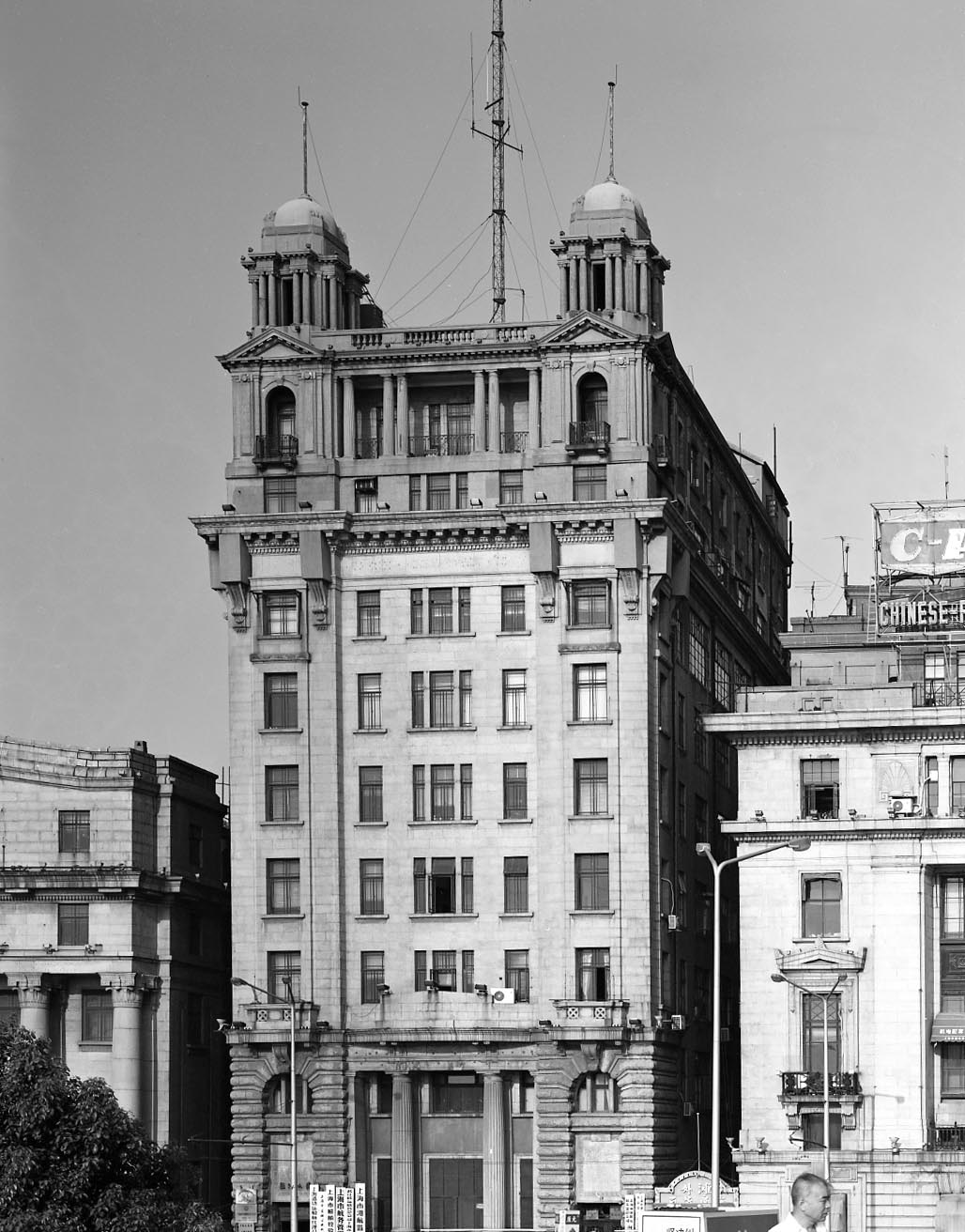
North China Daily News Building

== Design ==
The North China Daily News Building is a reinforced concrete structure with Baroque towers, Neoclassical pillars, and Renaissance relief sculpture. The first seven floors are faced with granite, the lowest two floors of which are rough hewn. The upper story features are clad in cast stone, known locally as Shanghai Plaster. The building originally incorporated the statues of two goddesses, which flanked the marble entrance, but these statues were destroyed during the Cultural Revolution. The building contains 9,043 square meters (97,340 sq ft) of office space, and lies on a 1,043-square-meter (11,230 sq ft) plot of land.

== Bibliography ==
- Shea, Marilyn (2007). "The Bund – Picture Guide to Historic Buildings". University of Maine at Farmington. Archived from the original on 19 July 2011.
