= Bowtie Life Insurance =

Hong Kong insurance company

- Native name: 保泰人壽
- Type: Private
- Industry: Insurance
- Founded: 2017 Hong Kong
- Founder: Fred Ngan; Michael Chan
- Headquarters: Bowtie Life Insurance Tower, 68 Johnston Road, Wan Chai, Hong Kong
- Key people: Colin Lam (Chairman); John Tsang (Senior Advisor); Tony Mok (Medical Advisor); James Lau (Independent Non-executive Director)
- Products: Health insurance; Voluntary Health Insurance Scheme (VHIS); Cancer Insurance; Critical Illness Insurance; Accident Insurance; Life Insurance
- Website: bowtie.com.hk

Bowtie (Chinese: 保泰; Bowtie Life Insurance), is Hong Kong’s first virtual insurer. On 20 December 2018, it was granted Hong Kong’s first virtual insurance licence by the Insurance Authority. Bowtie provides fully online insurance products to customers in Hong Kong, and has been approved by the Food and Health Bureau (now reorganised as the Health Bureau) to launch products under the Voluntary Health Insurance Scheme (VHIS).

Bowtie focuses on pure protection insurances, including Voluntary Health Insurance Scheme (VHIS) plans, critical illness insurance, cancer medical insurance, accident insurance, and life insurance. It promotes the principle of “Here to help, not to sell”, and operates a direct-to-consumer model without commissions, supported by technology-driven operations. This approach reduced premiums by up to 40% compared with other insurance products in the market, while offering customer support and one-to-one claims assistance.

According to data from the Insurance Authority, as of Q4 2024 Bowtie ranked first in Hong Kong by the number of new individual non-single-premium policies in the direct sales channel. It also held a 32% share of new individual non-single-premium business sold through online channels, with cumulative total sum assured exceeding HK$133 billion. Bowtie was named the top-ranked company in Hong Kong in the Financial Times “High-Growth Companies Asia-Pacific 2025” list, and ranked 65th across the Asia-Pacific region. Bowtie’s development has also received industry recognition, including the appointment of former Financial Secretary John Tsang as Senior Advisor, and a US$70 million financing round led by Sun Life in 2025.

On 1 February 2026, Bowtie’s headquarters building at 68 Johnston Road, Wan Chai was officially renamed “Bowtie Life Insurance Tower” (Chinese: 保泰人壽大廈). Bowtie leases seven floors in the building as its new headquarters, including a customer service centre on the second floor. A Bowtie-branded coffee shop, “Bow Coffee”, was located at the street level, providing face-to-face product consultations and services for existing policyholders.
