= AIA Group =

Hong Kong insurance and finance company

AIA Group Limited
- Native name: 友邦保險控股有限公司
- Traded as: SEHK: 1299}; S&P Asia 50 component; Hang Seng Index component
- Industry: Insurance and financial services
- Founded: 19 December 1919; 106 years ago in Shanghai (as American Asiatic Underwriters, later known as AIG); 1 December 2009; 16 years ago in New York City (as American International Assurance Company, Limited)
- Founder: Cornelius Vander Starr
- Headquarters: AIA Central, Central, Hong Kong
- Area served: Asia-Pacific
- Key people: Lee Yuan Siong (President and Chief Executive)
- Products: Life insurance; accident and health insurance; savings plans; employee benefits; variable contracts; investments; securities; credit life and pension services
- Net income: ▼US$6.27 billion (2025)
- Total assets: ▲US$345 billion (2025)
- Total equity: ▲US$48 billion (2025)
- Website: www.aia.com

AIA Group
- Traditional Chinese: 友邦保險
- Simplified Chinese: 友邦保险
Transcriptions
Standard Mandarin
- Hanyu Pinyin: Yǒubāng Bǎoxiǎn
Yue: Cantonese
- Jyutping: Jau5 bong1 bou2 him2

AIA Group Limited (Chinese: 友邦保險) is a Hong Kong multinational insurance and finance company. It is one of the largest publicly traded life insurance groups in the Asia-Pacific. AIA traces back to an American insurance firm that was established in Shanghai, China in 1919. The company then became the founding member of the American International Group (AIG) conglomerate, from which it was separated after the 2008 global financial crisis.

AIA underwrites life insurance for individuals and businesses, as well as accident and health insurance. It provides retirement planning and wealth management services, variable contracts, investments and securities. It and its wholly-owned subsidiaries operate in 18 markets in East Asia and Oceania, with more than 43 million policyholders.

== History ==
=== Precursor companies in Shanghai ===
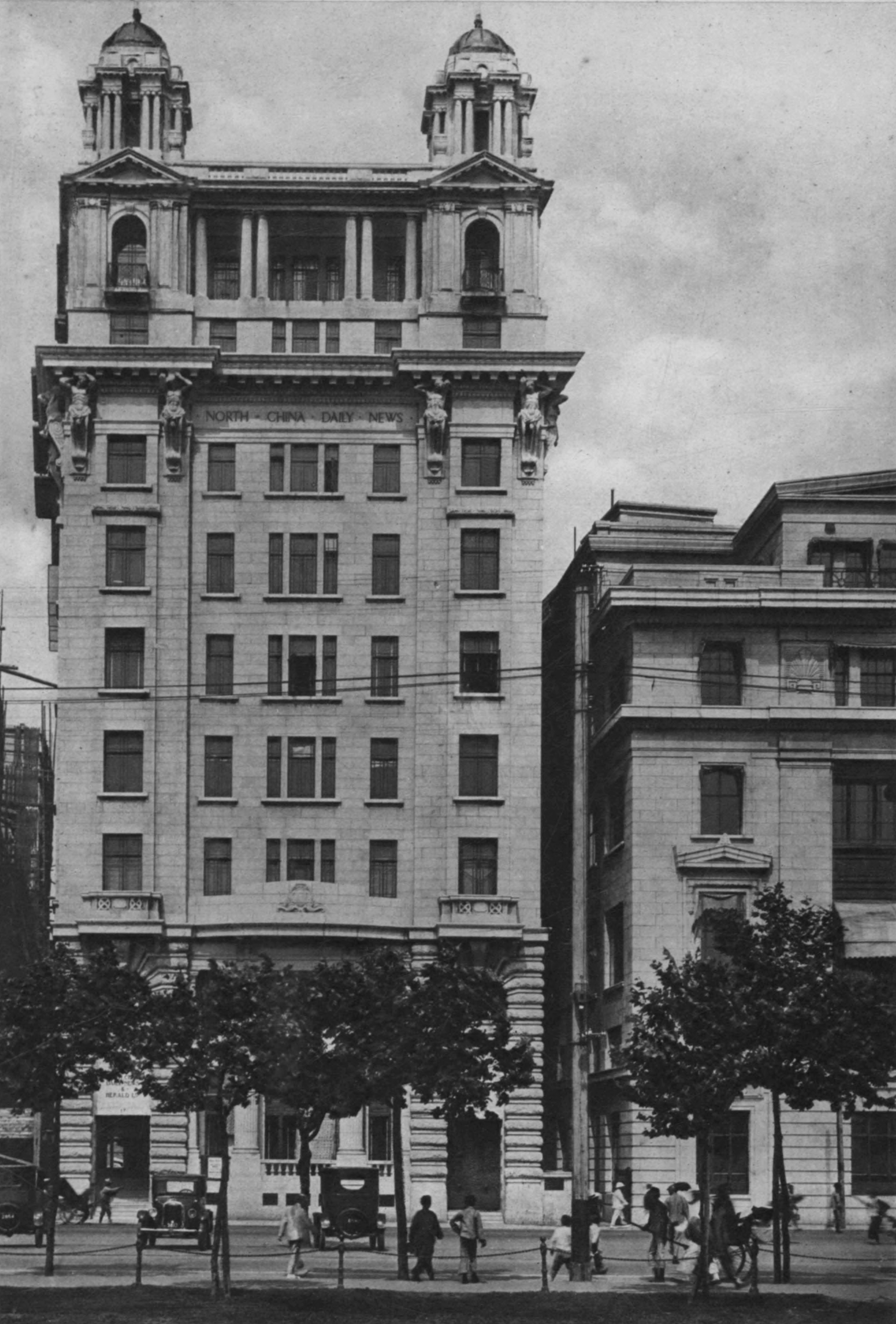
American Asiatic Underwriters operated from the North China Daily News Building (left) on The Bund from 1927 before vacating due to Japan's occupation of Shanghai. The Shanghai branch of AIA returned to the building in 1996.

American businessman Cornelius Vander Starr worked in the vehicle insurance business in San Francisco before joining the US Army during World War I and then working in the steamship business in Japan. He then moved to Shanghai, where he was employed by American banking tycoon Frank Jay Raven to manage his insurance agency.

On 19 December 1919, Starr founded his own small insurance company called American Asiatic Underwriters in Shanghai that specialized in products covering fire and marine risks. It operated as an agent for other American insurers, each assuming a portion of the risk insured by Starr's business without the need to deploy employees abroad.

Using funds from American Asiatic Underwriters, Starr founded Asia Life Insurance two years later. The new company became the first foreign company to sell life insurances to local Chinese customers. Both moved into 17 The Bund in 1927, after Starr purchased the building as a center for banking and insurance.

=== Founding ===
In April 1931, Starr established International Assurance Company in Shanghai, with British and Chinese partners. In 1933, AIA opened a branch in Singapore that also served Malaya.

American Asiatic Underwriters and Asia Life Insurance collectively gained control over 30% of the Chinese insurance industry, and by 1937, 75% of China's insurance income, valued at 38.8 million fabi, could be attributed to the latter.

In 1939, the American Asiatic Underwriters headquarters was relocated to New York City after the Japanese invasion of Shanghai and the Japanese military forced the business to stop in 1941. After the end of the Second World War, AIA was the first foreign insurance company to resume operations.

On 1 January 1949, K.K. Tse moved American Asiatic Underwriters's regional headquarters, 40 employees and their families, and company records to Hong Kong. Before the company's closure in December 1950,

=== Relocation to Hong Kong ===
After the communist takeover of mainland China, AIA's headquarters were relocated again, to the British colony of Hong Kong. In 1970, AIA became a subsidiary of New York-based American International Group (AIG), which was formed as a holding company for Starr's companies in the US. In June 1951, Starr's companies stopped operations in Shanghai.

Despite AIG not operating in China, it maintained close ties with the Chinese leadership. Between 1975 and 1992, its CEO and chairman Maurice R. Greenberg traveled to China dozens of times to fraternise with officials including Jiang Zemin and Zhu Rongji when they were the mayor of Shanghai. Jiang and Zhu later respectively became China's president and premier. Greenberg also sat in an advisory board to the mayor, while the company helped draft China's 1995 insurance law, persuade the US Congress to support China's ascension to the World Trade Organization, and establish a New York branch of the Chinese central bank.

=== Return to China ===
The Chinese government gradually removed restrictions on foreign businesses after its reform and opening up that began in 1979. On 25 September 1992, AIA became one of the first companies to be granted the foreign insurer licenses to operate in China. The companies marketed the event as a "return home". AIA's top managers came from Hong Kong and Taiwan, while low- and mid-level managers were mainland Chinese, most being local employees from Shanghai.

=== Financial crisis and listing ===
During the US subprime mortgage crisis of 2007, AIG nearly went bankrupt because it assumed outsized risk on bets on the property market that resulted in losses worth billions of dollars. It was rescued by the US Treasury, the Federal Reserve, and the Federal Reserve Bank of New York through various means, including the creation of special-purpose vehicles.

On 1 December 2009, AIG sold preferred equity interests in two newly formed international life insurance subsidiaries, American International Assurance Company, Limited (AIA) and American Life Insurance Company (ALICO), to the Federal Reserve Bank of New York to reduce its debt by US$25 billion.

By 2009, AIG had planned to list AIA on the Hong Kong Stock Exchange with The Blackstone Group hired as an IPO advisor. The initial public offering was intended to help AIG repay US$182.3 billion bailout credit line from the US government. Before the planned listing, Prudential plc, the UK's largest insurance firm, offered to buy AIA for US$35.5 billion to expand its Asian business as growth in the UK declined. Prudential shareholders voted against the purchase price, which was then reduced to US$30.4 billion. AIG rejected the smaller offer, and the attempted acquisition failed.

AIA held an initial public offering on 29 October 2010 that raised approximately HK$159.08 billion (US$20.51 billion), making it the third largest IPO in history. The IPO price was set at a lower valuation than its public competitors in Asia-Pacific. Shares rose 17% with two billion shares changing hands on the first trading day.

The stake of AIA Aurora (controlled by AIG) was diluted to 32.9%. At one point, AIA was tied with Tencent as the largest constituent of the Hang Seng Index during the February 2021 review. However, following multiple index adjustments, its weighting declined to 4.72% as of June 2025.

On 11 September 2012, AIA acquired a 92.3% stake in Sri Lankan insurer Aviva NDB Insurance from British insurer Aviva and Sri Lanka's NDB Bank, one of Sri Lanka's largest financial conglomerates. AIA also entered into an exclusive 20-year bancassurance agreement with NDB. On 7 October, AIA acquired ING Group's Malaysian insurance subsidiaries for a cash consideration of €1.336 billion (US$1.73 billion). On 21 December, AIG sold all of its 13.69% shareholding in AIA.

Since 2 June 2013, AIA has had an exclusive bancassurance agreement with Citibank that encompasses 11 AIA markets in Asia-Pacific, namely Hong Kong, mainland China, South Korea, Singapore, Thailand, Malaysia, Indonesia, the Philippines, Vietnam, Australia, and India.

In August 2024, the Hong Kong Insurance Authority fined AIA HK$23 million for shortcomings related to its anti-money laundering (AML) oversight. The inspection, which covered business activities between March 2016 and October 2022, identified deficiencies in the company's anti-money laundering systems, including delays in identifying certain politically exposed persons and in applying enhanced due diligence to some high-risk customers.

== See also ==
- List of insurance companies in Hong Kong
