= Well Link Insurance Group =

Hong Kong-based insurance group

- Native name: 立橋保險集團
- Type: Subsidiary
- Industry: Insurance
- Founded: 2016; 10 years ago in Hong Kong
- Headquarters: Hong Kong
- Area served: Hong Kong
- Key people: Mr. Thomas Lee (CEO)
- Products: Life, health, and general insurance, savings products
- Revenue: ▲HK$1.58 billion (2025)
- Net income: ▲HK$214.62 million (2025)
- Total assets: ▲HK$17.68 billion (2025)
- Total equity: ▲HK$1.85 billion (2025)
- Parent: Well Link Financial Group
- Subsidiaries: Well Link Life Insurance Company Limited; Well Link General Insurance Company Limited
- Website: www.wli.com.hk

Well Link Insurance Group
- Traditional Chinese: 立橋保險集團
- Simplified Chinese: 立桥保险集团
Transcriptions
Standard Mandarin
- Hanyu Pinyin: Lìqiáo Bǎoxiǎn Jítuán
Yue: Cantonese
- Jyutping: laap6 kiu4 bou2 him2 zaap6 tyun4

Well Link Insurance Group (Chinese: 立橋保險集團; pinyin: laap6 kiu4 bou2 him2 zaap6 tyun4) is a Hong Kong-based insurance group with wholly-owned subsidiaries including Well Link Life Insurance Company Limited (hereinafter referred to as Well Link Life) and Well Link General Insurance Company Limited (hereinafter referred to as Well Link Insurance), which operate life insurance and general insurance businesses respectively.

Well Link Life ranked 10th among life insurers in HK by new business premium in 1H 2026.

== History ==
In August 2016, Well Link Financial Group acquired Direct Asia (Hong Kong) Limited, which was subsequently renamed Well Link General Insurance Company Limited in June 2017.

In April 2019, Well Link Life received approval from the Insurance Authority to operate a long-term life insurance business, and officially launched in July 2019.

In January 2026, AM Best has revised the outlooks to positive from stable and affirmed the Financial Strength Rating of "B+" (Good) and the Long-Term Issuer Credit Rating of "bbb-" (Good) of Well Link Life.

In April 2026, Fitch Ratings has assigned Well Link Life an Insurer Financial Strength (IFS) Rating of 'BBB' (Good), and the outlook is stable.. In the same month, S&P Global assigned its 'BBB-' local currency long-term issuer credit IFS ratings to Well Link Life, and the outlook is stable.

In June 2026, Well Link Life, issued a US$200 million, 10-year Tier 2 capital bond in the international market, marking the first international bond offering of this type by a locally established Hong Kong life insurance company. The debt securities were subsequently listed on the Hong Kong Stock Exchange, with both S&P and Fitch assigning the issuance a BB+ rating.

== Operations ==
=== Well Link Life ===
Well Link Life (Chinese: 立橋人壽) offers life insurance, endowment, and annuity products.

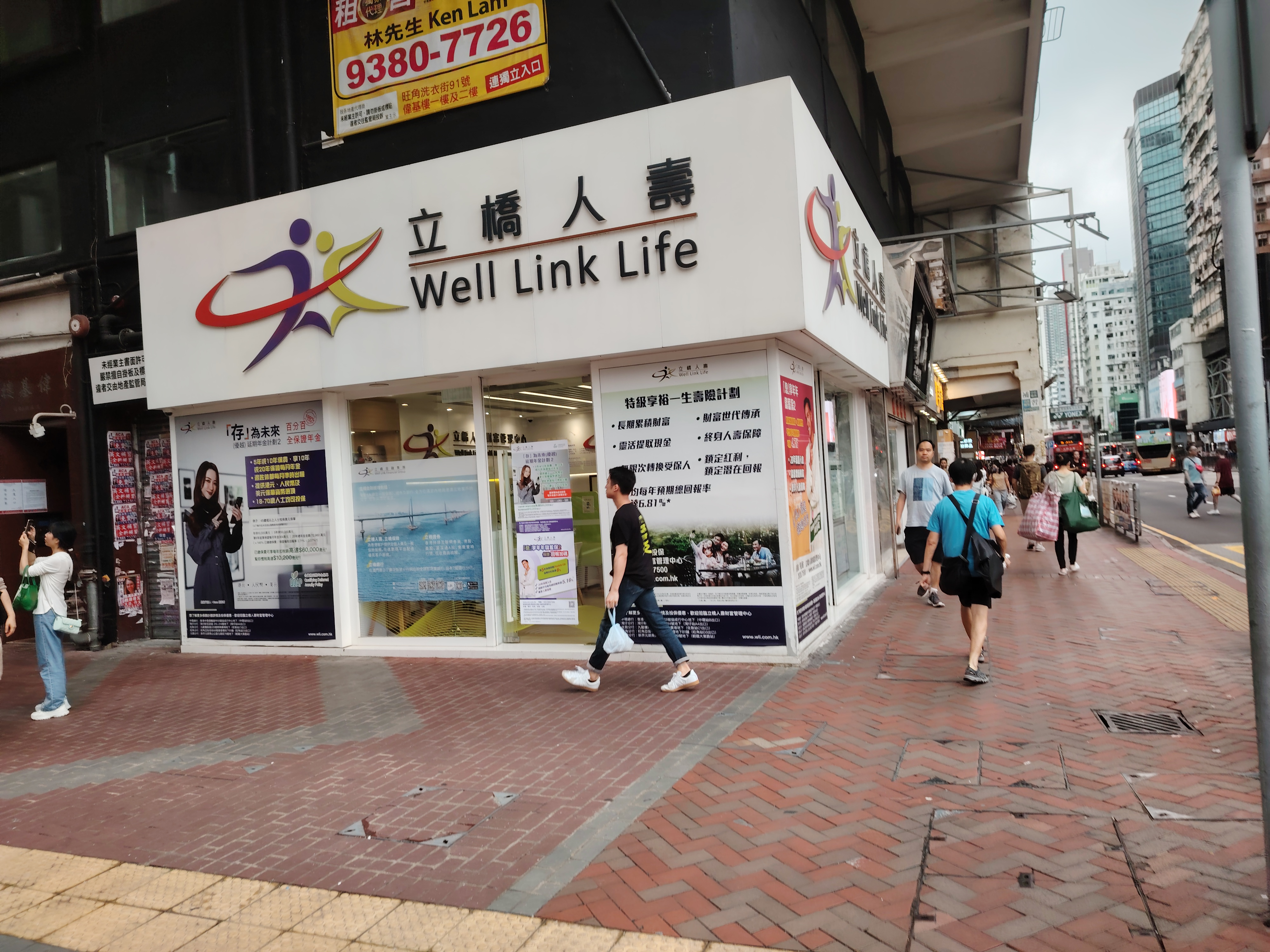
Well Link Life Wealth Management Centre located in Mong Kok

=== Well Link Insurance ===
Well Link Insurance (Chinese: 立橋保險) was formerly known as Direct Asia (Hong Kong) Limited, which provides general insurance products and services including private motor insurance, travel insurance, home insurance, commercial insurance plans.

== See also ==
- Well Link Financial Group
- List of insurance companies in Hong Kong
