= Mandatory Provident Fund =

Pension fund for Hong Kong residents

The Mandatory Provident Fund (Chinese: 強制性公積金), often abbreviated as MPF (強積金), is a compulsory saving scheme (pension fund) for the retirement of residents in Hong Kong. Most employees and their employers are required to contribute monthly to mandatory provident fund schemes provided by approved private organisations, according to their salaries and the period of employment. It is regulated by the Mandatory Provident Fund Schemes Authority.

== History ==
By the late 1990s, only 29% of Hong Kong's three-million workforce was covered by formal retirement provisions, Hong Kong's social security system is faced with the demographic challenge of a growing number of elderly people in the future. There were some calls to establish a central provident fund and heated debates among government, politicians and trade unions in the early 1990s.

After some 30 years of debate on how to provide financial security for the ageing Hong Kong population, the British Hong Kong Government legislated on a mandatory, privately managed fully funded contribution scheme in 1995 along the lines of the second pillar defined in the World Bank report. Legislators representing the business sector refused to back the MPF legislation unless an offset mechanism was included to allow employers to use amounts paid by them to make long-service payments or severance to staff. Under the legislation, occupational schemes are unlike publicly run national provident funds found in other countries, and those schemes marketed to the public as mandatory provident fund (MPF) are established and run by financial institutions.

In March 2021, the Mandatory Provident Fund Schemes Authority said that MPF providers should not allow workers using a BN(O) as evidence to withdraw early from the fund as the Hong Kong government no longer recognises the passports as legal travel documents. In April 2023, The Wall Street Journal published an editorial about MPF withdrawals being denied to those using BN(O) passports as evidence of leaving Hong Kong, saying the MPF "intended to coerce residents to stay in the city and retaliate against anyone who leaves with a BNO passport by confiscating their property."

== Regulatory oversight ==
The Mandatory Provident Fund was implemented in December 2000, following the enactment of the Mandatory Provident Fund Schemes Ordinance on 27 July 1995 and Provident Fund Schemes Legislation (Amendment) Ordinance 1998 in March 1998. The Mandatory Provident Fund Schemes Authority (MPFA), up and running in September 2000, is charged with supervising the provision of MPF schemes – it registers schemes and ensures that approved trustees administer schemes prudently. The MPFA have powers to ensure compliance, including the ability to conduct inspections, audits and investigations, and also to impose sanction on a trustee in the event of breaches of the legislation.

Initially, all 300,000 employers in Hong Kong without an existing occupational retirement scheme are required to enrol their employees, in the region of 2.2 million individuals, in an MPF plan by 1 December 2000. Any company that has not set up an MPF plan may be liable to criminal prosecution with possible fines of up to HK$100,000 and six months imprisonment; persistent offenders risk a penalty of HK$200,000 and one year in prison. At the same time, companies hoping to be admitted as service providers were also required to register by the deadline.

== Mechanism ==
As the scheme operates on the principle of fully funded defined contributions into a privately managed plan funds contributed by employers and employees have and managed as a trust, which compartmentalises fund assets from those of the manager, investment decisions are delegated to trustee in the private sector. Legislation defines three types of MPF schemes:

- master trust scheme – membership open to workers of different employers and different self-employed persons. These enjoy economies of scale from pooling the contributions of small employer units together for administration and investment. This type of scheme is especially suitable for small and medium-sized enterprises.
- employer sponsored scheme – membership open to the employees of a single employer, thus is only practical for large corporations.
- industry scheme – established for worker of industries where the degree of labour mobility is high, for example, catering and construction.

The system is mandatory for all employees in Hong Kong who have an employment contract of 60 days or more and applies also to the self-employed between ages 18 and 65. Those employed in the catering and construction sectors are generally exempt but they may be covered on a daily basis. Hawkers (street vendors), domestic employees, persons covered by statutory pension or provident fund schemes such as civil servants or teachers. Members of occupational retirement schemes with specific exemptions, and foreign citizens who work in Hong Kong for periods shorter than 13 months or who are covered by another country's retirement system may also be exempt.

Under the scheme, the choice of MPF provider is the province of the employer, with employees having no say. Employees are expected to join the scheme administered by the MPF provider of their new employers when they change jobs. The employer and the employee each contribute 5 per cent (a sum equal to 10%) of the salary of employee whose earnings are above a certain threshold to funds run by banks, insurers or fund houses. Total contributions are capped at HK$1,500 a month. Employees and self-employed are required to contribute 5% of their earnings to their MPF fund. When the scheme was launched, the upper relevant income limit for contributions was $20,000. The lower and upper thresholds for relevant earnings are subject to periodic adjustment.

An employee's MPF assets are fully vested, and are portable when the employee changes employers. Benefits that have accrued under the scheme of a former employer can be transferred to a scheme operated by the new employer. There are strict guidelines on the types of assets in the investment funds. However, MPF providers may offer more than one investment option constituted along the guidelines to its members through different funds, thus employees may build their own investment portfolio out of the funds provided by the provider chosen by their employers. Employees may elect on the asset allocation among different funds available from their providers, but may only do so for their part of the retirement contribution.

Hong Kong employees and their employers started contributing to the scheme as early as 2000, but the employees can only withdraw accrued benefits at 65 and other specified conditions under the regulation. Only since 1 November 2013, employees were given freedom to transfer their fund assets to any provider they liked, once a year. However, only the portion of the fund assets corresponding to their contributions could be transferred.

Offset of Long Service Payment/Severance Payment is a feature of the MPF since the inception. The legislation permits employers to use contributions they have made to offset payments made to employees in respect of long service/redundancy or layoff. According to analysis of offsets by unions between 2008 and 2014, it was found that 37 per cent of early withdrawals of MPF benefits, valued at HK$10.6 billion, came from offsetting by employers.

== Criticisms ==
=== Increase in cost of employment ===
The MPF was launched during a downturn in the economic cycle, and there was pressure from businesses to delay its launch. Furthermore, there was disquiet among many small businesses, for which employers' MPF contributions represented a de facto 5% increase to payroll costs.

=== Inadequacy of provision ===
When the scheme was launched, there were concerns among employee federations that due to changing life expectancy and investment returns, the assets constituting the fund at retirement would only suffice to cover living expenses for a short period.

=== Fund management charges ===
Common with other defined-contribution system with individual accounts, administrative fees may be high. MPF trustees are free to set their fees provided that fees and structures are transparent. As there is no uniform method of charging fees, fund holders attempting to choose may be confused by the lack of comparability between different funds.

=== Offset mechanism ===
CY Leung made a pledge during the 2012 chief executive election to introduce measures to reduce the use of the offsetting mechanism progressively. However, union representatives criticised Leung for stalling on the delivery of his campaign promise as no changes had been made to the offset arrangements as at the end of October 2015. In early 2016, the pro-establishment Bauhinia Foundation endorsed phasing out the offset mechanism, saying that additional costs to employers would be affordable, as the amount to only 0.4% of payroll costs expenditures, and the annual net profit margin would be lowered by a mere 0.04 percent.

Global Aging Institute president Richard Jackson remarked in 2016 that the retiring baby-boomers in Hong Kong were faced with challenges, as MPF was immature and traditional family retirement support was breaking down. Dr Ernest Chui, an academic at Hong Kong University criticised the scheme as being unadapted to Hong Kong workers. He said that in terms of the demographic changes that Hong Kong is facing, "the MPF scheme is very ineffective in terms of 'replacement rate' and thus cannot satisfy people's need after they retire." Robert Palacios, a senior economist at the World Bank noted that the Mandatory Provident Fund's offset mechanism, where an employee's severance pay can be offset by the contributions made to his or her retirement funds, undermined the effectiveness of retirement protection in the city. Palacio explained that contributions being made are directed at two purposes – unemployment benefit and at the same time as a pension – thus not achieving either objective. From the period since its launch to 2010, employers used HK$12 billion from employees' MPF accounts to make severance or long-service payments; employees made redundant risked seeing their MPF funds depleted by these withdrawals.

== See also ==
- Inland Revenue Department (Hong Kong)
- Employment contract
