= Mandatory Provident Fund Schemes Authority =

Hong Kong statutory body

- 強制性公積金計劃管理局

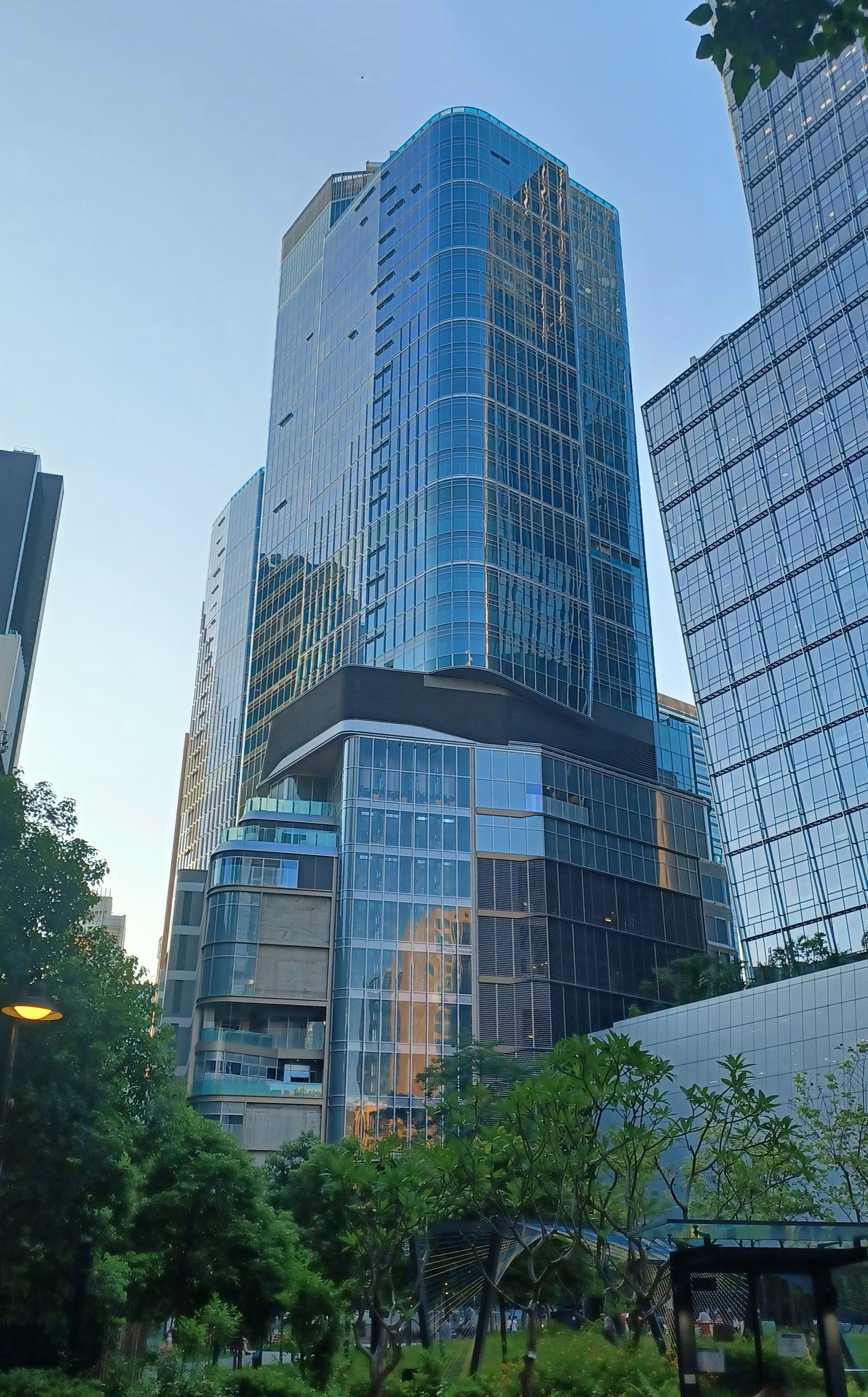
- Headquarters in Kwun Tong

Agency overview
- Formed: 17 September 1998; 27 years ago
- Jurisdiction: Hong Kong
- Headquarters: Kwun Tong, Hong Kong
- Agency executives: Ayesha Macpherson Lau, Chairman; Cheng Yan-chee, Managing Director
- Website: https://www.mpfa.org.hk/

The Mandatory Provident Fund Schemes Authority (MPFA) of Hong Kong is the statutory body charged with regulating the operations of Mandatory Provident Fund (MPF) schemes and occupational retirement (ORSO) schemes. It is a regulator run independently of the Government of Hong Kong.

== History ==
On 3 August 1995, the Mandatory Provident Fund Schemes Ordinance (MPFSO)was established to provide the framework for the MPF system.

On 17 September 1997, the MPFA was established as a statutory body under the MPFSO.

On 1 December 2000, the MPF system came into effect.

== Regulatory actions ==
In December 1998, the MPFA approved six sets of guidelines outlining criteria and licence application procedures for scheme service providers. They were the first batch of their kind to be issued by the MPFA.

In March 2021, the MPFA announced that British National (Overseas) passports (BNO) could no longer be used as evidence for early withdrawal for MPF funds. In April 2023, The Wall Street Journal (WSJ) wrote in an opinion piece that it intended to coerce residents to stay Hong Kong and retaliate against anyone who leaves with a BNO passport by confiscating their property. Western finance firms were forced to abide by this confiscation to continue operating in Hong Kong. In response, the MPFA denounced WSJ's editorial as "false" and "misleading".

On 26 June 2024, the MPFA launched the eMPF platform which was a digital platform that would consolidate the operations of all MPF operators into one single platform. In February 2025, the MPFA stated it would commence the second phase of reforms that would further enhance the eMPF platform.

In May 2025, as part of the United States federal government credit-rating downgrades, Moody's Ratings downgraded the US debt rating to Aa1 from Aaa. Hong Kong pension fund managers raised concern to the MPFA of potential forced selling on their US Treasury holdings due to them no longer meeting the required credit rating for investments. The only remaining approved AAA score came from Japan's Rating & Investment Information Inc. In response, the MPFA instructed MPF trustees and fund managers to prepare for a contingency plan in case the last remaining credit agency downgraded the US credit rating. The MPFA said such preparation would be needed as it had no plan to change the current investment requirements. In the same month, the MPFA stated that private equity funds listed in Hong Kong were permissible investments for MPF funds.

== See also ==
- Securities and Futures Commission
- Hong Kong Monetary Authority
- List of financial supervisory authorities by country
