= Gross premiums written =

In the insurance industry, gross premiums written is the sum of both direct premiums written (see next paragraph) and assumed premiums written, before deducting ceded reinsurance. Direct premiums written represents the premiums on all policies the company's insurance subsidiaries have issued during the year. In the United States, assumed premiums written represents the premiums that the insurance subsidiaries have received from an authorized state-mandated pool or under previous fronting facilities.

When a non-life (property and casualty) insurance company issues a contract to provide insurance against loss, the revenues (premiums) expected to be received over the life of the contract are called gross premiums written. Insurance companies often purchase reinsurance from another insurance company to protect themselves against the risk of a loss above a certain threshold; the cost of reinsurance (reinsurance premiums) is deducted from gross premiums written to arrive at net premiums written. Net premiums written is the sum of all types of insurance premiums which a company may collect throughout the whole duration of existing insurance policies minus the costs like agents' commissions and premiums paid made for outwards reinsurance.

== Net Premiums Written ==
Net premiums written is gross written premium (direct written premium plus assumed written premium) less ceded written premium. It gives an indication of the level of sales for risks that the company retains for itself. Although there is a presumption that an insurance company is financially sound when it possesses a positive net premiums written, it is also important to remember that having a negative net premiums doesn't mean that the company is insolvent and is not capable of providing the benefits promised. The nature and timing of reinsurance and other transactions can lead to the net premium written being negative, but this is likely to be temporary.

Under accrual-basis accounting, only premiums pertaining to the relevant accounting period are recognized as revenues. These premiums are called net premiums earned.
