= Insurance Authority =

Hong Kong statutory body

- 保險業監管局

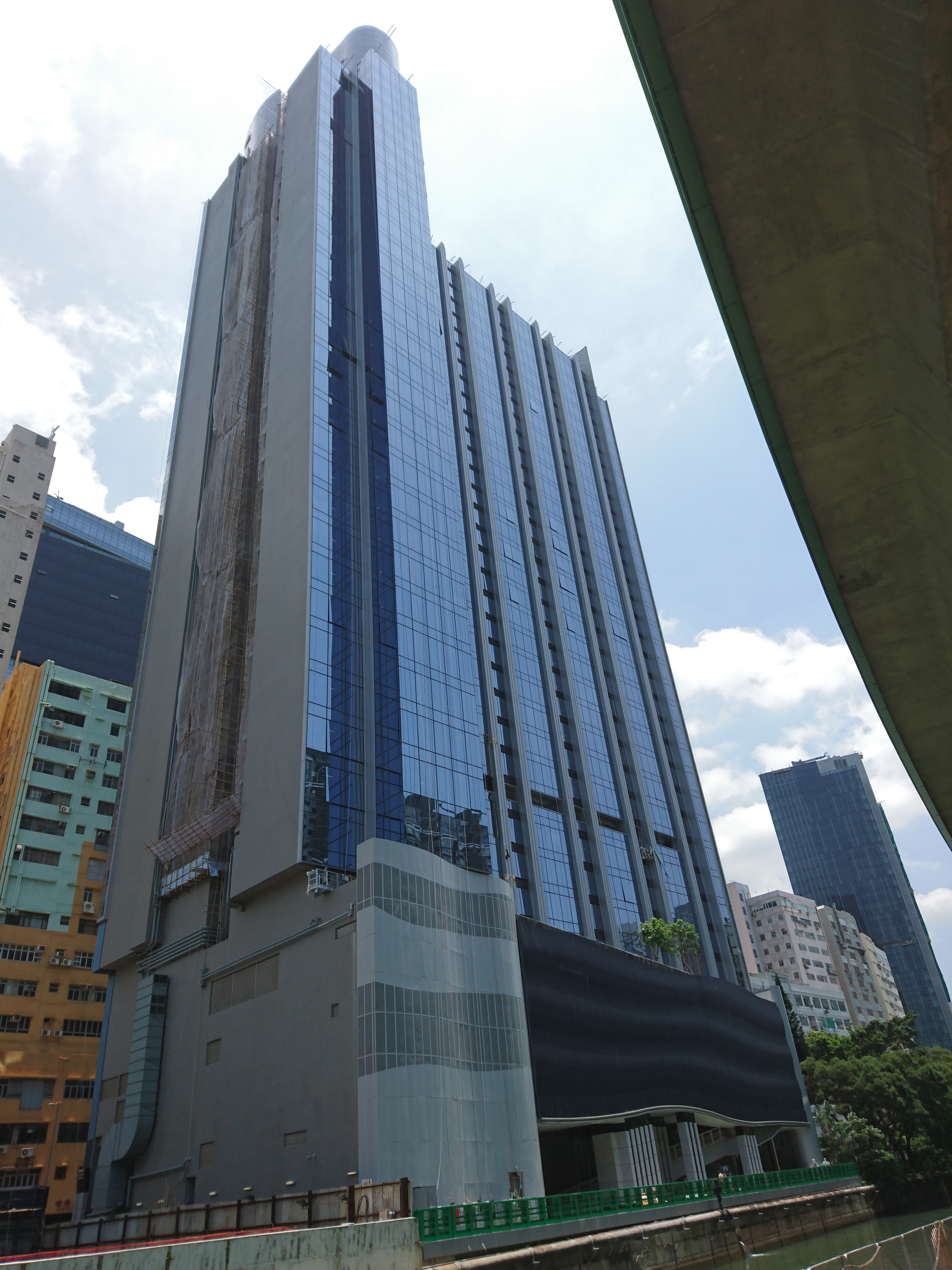
- Headquarters at Wong Chuk Hang

Agency overview
- Formed: 7 December 2015; 10 years ago
- Preceding agency: Office of the Commissioner of Insurance
- Jurisdiction: Hong Kong
- Headquarters: Wong Chuk Hang, Hong Kong
- Agency executives: Stephen Yiu, Chairman; Clement Cheung, CEO
- Website: https://www.ia.org.hk/

The Insurance Authority (IA) of Hong Kong is the statutory body charged with regulating the insurance industry in Hong Kong. It is a regulator run independently of the Government of Hong Kong.

== History ==
Prior to the establishment of the IA, the insurance industry in Hong Kong was overseen by the Hong Kong government's Office of the Commissioner of Insurance, which had no power to control agents. The government first attempted to launch the IA in 2003, but the plan was shelved after strong opposition from the insurance industry. The proposal was raised again in 2011 with the government agreeing to withdraw a section that gave the IA power to temporarily suspend insurance companies or their staff from working in the industry without a disciplinary procedure or appeal. However the government remained firm on the penalties the IA could impose. In July 2015, Hong Kong legislators passed a law to set up the IA that would replace the Office of the Commissioner of Insurance. On 7 December 2015, the IA was officially established.

On 26 June 2017, the IA officially commenced operations taking over from the Office of the Insurance Commissioner as regulator for all insurance companies and as well as overseeing their insurance sales staff. It had far more power compared to its predecessor. Its first task was to work with the China Insurance Regulatory Commission regarding cross border regulation.

== Regulatory actions ==
In August 2017, the IA announced plans to introduce a licensing fast track for online-only insurance companies. It was specifically for online-only insurers providing direct sales of basic life insurance, travel or personal accident coverage. In December 2018, the first license under this scheme was given to Bowtie Life Insurance.

In July 2022, the IA wound up Target Insurance which was Hong Kong's largest vehicle insurance company at the time. It was deemed insolvent after HK$1.2 billion was found missing from its accounts. This was the first time the IA had to perform a significant regulatory action since its establishment.

In July 2024, the IA took over Tahoe Life Insurance after the company went into financial distress. This was due to it restrictions being placed on it by the IA in 2021 after a HK$2.2 billion debt investment with its real estate parent company Tahoe Group was discovered to be worthless.This marked the first time the IA had to take control over a distress life insurance company in Hong Kong.

In August 2024, the IA fined AIA Group HK$23 million due to insufficient anti–money laundering controls. At the time, this was the largest regulatory fine issued by the IA.

== See also ==
- Insurance regulatory law
- Securities and Futures Commission
- Hong Kong Monetary Authority
- List of financial supervisory authorities by country
